= List of Burton Albion F.C. seasons =

List of seasons played by English football team

Burton Albion Football Club is a professional association football club in the town of Burton upon Trent, Staffordshire, England. The team compete in League One, the third tier of the English football league system. The club moved its home ground in 2005 to the Pirelli Stadium from Eton Park. The club's nickname, The Brewers, evokes the brewing heritage of Burton upon Trent.

Burton Albion were formed in 1950 and initially joined the Birmingham & District League before switching to the Southern League eight years later. They were promoted from the Southern League Division One in 1965–66, 1971–72 and 1973–74 and were relegated from the Southern League Premier Division in 1970, 1973 and 1977. Burton spent 1979 to 1987 in the Northern Premier League, before reverting to the Southern League Premier Division. The club rejoined the Northern Premier League in 2001 and were promoted to the Conference as Northern Premier League champions in 2001–02.

Nigel Clough spent seven seasons as the club's player-manager in the Conference and then led them into the Football League as champions of the Conference in 2008–09. They lost the 2014 League Two play-off final, but went on to win the League Two title in 2014–15 and were promoted from League One in 2015–16. Burton spent two seasons in the Championship until relegation in 2018.

== Key ==
Key to league record

- Level = Level of the league in the current league system
- Pld = Games played
- W = Games won
- D = Games drawn
- L = Games lost
- GF = Goals for
- GA = Goals against
- GD = Goals difference
- Pts = Points
- Position = Position in the final league table
- Top scorer and number of goals scored shown in bold when he was also top scorer for the division.

Key to cup records

- Res = Final reached round
- Rec = Final club record in the form of wins-draws-losses
- PR = Preliminary round
- QR1 (2, etc.) = Qualifying Cup rounds
- G = Group stage
- R1 (2, etc.) = Proper Cup rounds
- QF = Quarter-finalists
- SF = Semi-finalists
- F = Finalists
- A(QF, SF, F) = Area quarter-, semi-, finalists
- W = Winners

=== League standings ===
Year	League														Cup competitions						Manager
Year	Division	Lvl	Pld	W	D	L	GF	GA	GD	Pts	Position	Leading league scorer		Average attendance	FA Cup		FL Cup FA Trophy		FL Trophy		Manager
Year	Division	Lvl	Pld	W	D	L	GF	GA	GD	Pts	Position	Name	Goals	Average attendance	Res	Rec	Res	Rec	Res	Rec	Manager
Joined Birmingham & District League
1950–51	**Birmingham & District League**		36	10	6	20	63	97	-34	26	16th of 19				–		–		–		McPhail
1951–52	**Birmingham & District League**		34	17	7	10	81	62	+19	41	5th of 18				QR1	1-1-1	–		–		Billy Wrigglesworth
1952–53	**Birmingham & District League**		36	20	8	8	95	45	+50	48	4th of 19				QR1	1-1-1	–		–		Tally Sneddon
1953–54	**Birmingham & District League**		46	31	6	9	120	58	+62	68	2nd of 24				QR3	2-1-1	–		–		Reg Weston
1954–55	**Birmingham & District League**		38	23	3	12	100	50	+50	49	3rd of 20				QR4	4-0-1	–		–		Reg Weston
1955–56	**Birmingham & District League**		38	20	7	11	82	48	+34	47	5th of 20				R3	7-2-1	–		–		Reg Weston
1956–57	**Birmingham & District League**		38	17	11	10	98	74	+24	45	4th of 20				R1	1-0-1	–		–		Reg Weston; Sammy Crooks
1957–58	**Birmingham & District League**		38	14	8	16	60	65	-5	38	11th of 20				QR4	0-0-1	–		–		Jackie Stamps
1957–58	**Birmingham & District League**		Club transferred												QR4	0-0-1	–		–		Jackie Stamps
1958–59	**Southern League**; **North-West Division**		34	3	3	28	41	104	-63	9	**18th of 18**; Relegated				QR1	1-0-1	–		–		Jackie Stamps
1959–60	**Southern League**; **Division One**		42	11	10	21	52	79	-27	32	**21st of 22**				QR1	0-0-1	–		–		Bill Townsend
1960–61	**Southern League**; **Division One**		40	12	4	24	63	85	-22	28	**19th of 21**				QR1	0-0-1	–		–		Bill Townsend
1961–62	**Southern League**; **Division One**		38	16	5	17	70	79	-9	37	**13th of 20**				QR2	1-0-1	–		–		Bill Townsend
1962–63	**Southern League**; **Division One**		38	10	10	18	48	76	-28	30	**15th of 20**				QR2	1-1-1	–		–		Peter Taylor
1963–64	**Southern League**; **Division One**		42	19	8	15	76	70	+6	46	**8th of 22**				QR1	0-0-1	–		–		Peter Taylor
1964–65	**Southern League**; **Division One**		42	20	7	15	83	75	+8	47	**10th of 22**				QR1	0-0-1	–		–		Peter Taylor
1965–66	**Southern League**; **Division One**		46	28	8	10	121	60	+61	64	**3rd of 22**; Promoted				R1	4-0-1	–		–		Alex Tait
1966–67	**Southern League**; **Premier Division**		42	17	5	20	63	71	-8	39	**15th of 22**				QR3	2-0-1	–		–		Alex Tait
1967–68	**Southern League**; **Premier Division**		42	14	6	22	51	73	-22	34	**19th of 22**; Reprieved				QR4	3-1-1	–		–		Alex Tait
1968–69	**Southern League**; **Premier Division**		42	16	5	21	55	71	-16	37	**17th of 22**				PR	0-0-1	–		–		Alex Tait
1969–70	**Southern League**; **Premier Division**		42	3	9	30	24	82	-58	15	**22nd of 22**; Relegated				QR3	2-0-1	QF	4-2-1	–		Alex Tait
1970–71	**Southern League**; **Division One**		38	19	10	9	56	37	+19	48	**5th of 20**				QR4	4-1-1	R3	2-0-1	–		Richie Norman
1971–72	**Southern League**; **Division One North**		34	18	13	3	58	27	+31	49	**2nd of 18**; Promoted				QR2	1-1-1	R2	1-0-1	–		Richie Norman
1972–73	**Southern League**; **Premier Division**		42	9	7	26	43	81	-38	25	**21st of 22**; Relegated				QR3	2-0-1	R1	0-0-1	–		Richie Norman
1973–74	**Southern League**; **Division One North**		42	27	9	6	88	32	+56	63	**2nd of 22**; Promoted				QR1	0-0-1	R1	0-0-1	–		Ken Gutteridge
1974–75	**Southern League**; **Premier Division**		42	18	13	11	54	48	+6	49	**5th of 22**				QR3	2-3-1	SF	6-2-1	–		Harold Bodle
1975–76	**Southern League**; **Premier Division**		42	17	9	16	52	53	-1	43	**10th of 22**				QR1	0-0-1	R2	1-0-1	–		Harold Bodle
1976–77	**Southern League**; **Premier Division**		42	10	10	22	41	52	-11	30	**21st of 22**; Relegated				QR4	3-1-1	R2	1-0-1	–		Mick Walker
1977–78	**Southern League**; **Division One North**	6	38	17	11	10	48	32	+16	45	**3rd of 22**				R1	4-0-1	R1	1-0-1	–		Mick Walker
1978–79	**Southern League**; **Division One North**	6	38	16	10	12	51	40	+11	42	**8th of 22**				PR	0-0-1	QR3	0-1-1	–		Ian Storey-Moore
1978–79	**Southern League**; **Division One North**	6	Club transferred												PR	0-0-1	QR3	0-1-1	–		Ian Storey-Moore
The club was transferred to the Northern Premier League to fill empty places opened by the creation of Alliance Premier League
1979–80	**Northern Premier League**	6	42	25	6	11	83	42	+41	56	**4th of 22**				R1	4-1-1	R3	5-1-1	–		Ian Storey-Moore
1980–81	**Northern Premier League**	6	42	19	8	15	70	62	+8	46	**6th of 22**				R1	4-3-1	R1	1-0-1	–		Ian Storey-Moore
1981–82	**Northern Premier League**	6	42	19	9	14	71	62	+9	47	**7th of 22**				QR4	3-1-1	R1	1-0-1	–		Neil Warnock
1982–83	**Northern Premier League**	6	42	24	9	9	81	53	+28	81	**3rd of 22**				QR2	1-1-1	R1	1-0-1	–		Neil Warnock
1983–84	**Northern Premier League**	6	42	17	13	12	61	47	+14	64	**5th of 22**				R1	4-1-1	QR3	0-0-1	–		Neil Warnock
1984–85	**Northern Premier League**	6	42	18	15	9	70	49	+21	69	**6th of 22**				R3	6-1-2	R2	2-0-1	–		Neil Warnock
1985–86	**Northern Premier League**	6	42	18	12	12	64	47	+17	66	**5th of 22**				QR4	0-0-1	R3	3-0-1	–		Neil Warnock
1986–87	**Northern Premier League**	6	42	16	6	20	56	68	-12	54	**12th of 22**				QR2	1-1-1	F	6-2-1	–		Brian Fidler
1986–87	**Northern Premier League**	6	Club transferred												QR2	1-1-1	F	6-2-1	–		Brian Fidler
1987–88	**Southern League**; **Premier Division**	6	42	11	14	17	62	74	-12	47	**16th of 22**				R1	0-1-1	R1	0-1-1	–		Brian Fidler; Vic Halom; Bobby Hope
1988–89	**Southern League**; **Premier Division**	6	42	18	10	14	79	68	+11	64	**8th of 22**				QR4	0-0-1	R2	1-1-1	–		Chris Wright
1989–90	**Southern League**; **Premier Division**	6	42	20	12	10	64	40	+24	72	**4th of 22**				QR4	0-1-1	R1	0-0-1	–		Ken Blair
1990–91	**Southern League**; **Premier Division**	6	42	15	15	12	59	48	+11	60	**7th of 22**				QR4	3-1-1	R2	2-0-1	–		Steve Powell
1991–92	**Southern League**; **Premier Division**	6	42	15	10	17	59	61	-2	55	**10th of 22**				QR4	3-0-1	QR3	0-1-1	–		Brian Fidler
1992–93	**Southern League**; **Premier Division**	6	40	16	11	13	53	50	+3	59	**8th of 21**				QR1	0-0-1	R2	0-1-1	–		Brian Kenning
1993–94	**Southern League**; **Premier Division**	6	42	15	11	16	57	49	+8	56	**11th of 22**				QR3	2-0-1	QR3	2-0-1	–		Brian Kenning
1994–95	**Southern League**; **Premier Division**	6	42	20	15	7	55	39	+16	75	**3rd of 22**				QR4	3-0-1	QR1	0-1-1	–		John Barton
1995–96	**Southern League**; **Premier Division**	6	42	13	12	17	55	56	-1	51	**16th of 22**				R1	4-1-1	R2	2-1-1	–		John Barton
1996–97	**Southern League**; **Premier Division**	6	42	18	12	12	70	53	+17	66	**6th of 22**				QR3	2-0-1	QR3	0-0-1	–		John Barton
1997–98	**Southern League**; **Premier Division**	6	42	21	8	13	64	43	+21	71	**3rd of 22**				QR1	0-0-1	R2	2-2-0	–		John Barton
1998–99	**Southern League**; **Premier Division**	6	42	17	7	18	58	52	+6	58	**13th of 22**				R1	3-0-1	R3	2-1-1	–		John Barton; Nigel Clough
1999–2000	**Southern League**; **Premier Division**	6	42	23	9	10	73	43	+30	78	**2nd of 22**				R1	3-2-1	R3	2-3-0	–		Nigel Clough
2000–01	**Southern League**; **Premier Division**	6	42	25	13	4	76	36	+40	88	**2nd of 22**			1,224	R1	3-3-1	QF	4-0-1	–		Nigel Clough
2000–01	**Southern League**; **Premier Division**	6	Club transferred												R1	3-3-1	QF	4-0-1	–		Nigel Clough
2001–02	**Northern Premier League**	6	44	31	11	2	106	30	+76	104	**1st of 22**; Promoted			1,430	QR4	2-1-1	SF	6-2-1	–		Nigel Clough
2002–03	**Football Conference**	5	42	13	10	19	52	77	-25	49	**16th of 22**			1,747	R1	1-2-0	R3	0-0-1	–		Nigel Clough
2003–04	**Football Conference**	5	42	15	7	20	57	59	-2	51	**14th of 22**			1,682	R2	2-0-1	R5	2-1-1	–		Nigel Clough
Football Conference expanded up to two levels and changed name of a higher division
2004–05	**Conference**; **National**	5	42	13	11	18	50	66	-16	50	**16th of 22**			1,368	QR4	0-2-0	SF	4-0-2	–		Nigel Clough
2005–06	**Conference**; **National**	5	42	16	12	14	50	52	-2	60	**9th of 22**			1,724	R3	3-2-1	R1	0-0-1	–		Nigel Clough
2006–07	**Conference**; **National**	5	46	22	9	15	52	47	+5	75	**6th of 24**			1,869	R1	1-0-1	R2	1-0-1	–		Nigel Clough
2007–08	**Conference**; **National**	5	46	23	12	11	79	56	+23	81	**5th of 24**			1,815	R2	2-1-1	QF	3-2-1	–		Nigel Clough
2007–08	**Conference**; **National**	5	Lost in the **play-off** semifinal.												R2	2-1-1	QF	3-2-1	–		Nigel Clough
2008–09	**Conference**; **National**	5	46	27	7	12	81	52	+29	88	**1st of 24**; Promoted			2,310	QR4	0-0-1	R3	1-2-1	–		Nigel Clough; Roy McFarland
**2009–10**	**League Two**	4	46	17	11	18	71	71	0	62	**13th of 24**	Shaun Harrad	21	3,213	R2	1-0-1	R1	0-0-1	R1	0-0-1	Paul Peschisolido
**2010–11**	**League Two**	4	46	12	15	19	56	70	-14	51	**19th of 24**	Aaron Webster	11	2,948	R4	0-0-0	R1	0-0-1	R2	0-0-1	Paul Peschisolido
**2011–12**	**League Two**	4	46	14	12	20	54	81	-27	54	**17th of 24**	Calvin Zola; Billy Kee	12	2,809	R1	0-0-1	R1	0-0-1	R1	0-0-1	Paul Peschisolido; Gary Rowett
**2012–13**	**League Two**	4	46	22	10	14	71	65	+6	76	**4th of 24**	Jacques Maghoma	16	2,859	R3	2-1-1	R3	1-1-1	R1	0-1-0	Gary Rowett
**2012–13**	**League Two**	4	Lost in the **play-off** semifinal.												R3	2-1-1	R3	1-1-1	R1	0-1-0	Gary Rowett
**2013–14**	**League Two**	4	46	19	15	12	47	42	+5	72	**6th of 24**	Billy Kee	12	2,720	R3	2-1-1	R2	1-1-0	R1	0-0-1	Gary Rowett
**2013–14**	**League Two**	4	Lost in the **play-off** final.												R3	2-1-1	R2	1-1-0	R1	0-0-1	Gary Rowett
**2014–15**	**League Two**	4	46	28	10	8	69	39	+30	94	**1st of 24**; Promoted	Lucas Akins	9	3,237	R1	0-0-1	R3	2-0-1	R2	0-0-1	Gary Rowett; Jimmy Floyd Hasselbaink
**2015–16**	**League One**	3	46	25	10	11	57	37	+20	85	**2nd of 24**; Promoted	Lucas Akins	12	4,089	R1	0-0-1	R2	1-0-1	R1	0-1-0	Jimmy Floyd Hasselbaink; Nigel Clough
**2016–17**	**Championship**	2	46	13	13	20	49	63	-14	52	**20th of 24**	Jackson Irvine	10	5,228	R3	0-0-1	R2	1-0-1	–		Nigel Clough
**2017–18**	**Championship**	2	46	10	11	25	38	81	-43	41	**23rd of 24**; Relegated	Lloyd Dyer	7	4,645	R3	0-0-1	R3	2-0-1	–		Nigel Clough
**2018–19**	**League One**	3	46	17	12	17	66	57	+9	63	**9th of 24**	Lucas Akins	13	3,351	R1	0-0-1	SF	5-0-2	GS	0-0-3	Nigel Clough
**2019–20**	**League One**	3	35	12	12	11	50	50	0	48	**12th of 24**	Lucas Akins	9	2,986	R3	2-1-1	R4	3-0-1	GS	1-0-2	Nigel Clough
**2019–20**	**League One**	3	Final league positions decided by Points-Per-Game after league was postponed due to COVID-19												R3	2-1-1	R4	3-0-1	GS	1-0-2	Nigel Clough
**2020–21**	**League One**	3	46	15	12	19	61	73	-12	57	**16th of 24**	Kane Hemmings	15	– (Note: COVID-19 prevented fans from attending games)	R1	0-0-1	R2	0-1-1	GS	0-2-1	Jake Buxton; Jimmy Floyd Hasselbaink
**2021–22**	**League One**	3	46	14	11	21	51	67	-16	53	**16th of 24**	Daniel Jebbison	7	3,229	R2	1-0-1	R1	0-1-0	GS	1-0-2	Jimmy Floyd Hasselbaink
**2022–23**	**League One**	3	46	15	11	20	57	79	-22	56	**15th of 24**	Victor Adeboyejo	11	3,445	R3	2-0-1	R1	0-0-1	R3	3-1-1	Jimmy Floyd Hasselbaink; Dino Maamria
**2023–24**	**League One**	3	46	12	10	24	39	67	-28	46	**20th of 24**	Beryly Lubala; Mark Helm; Joe Powell	5	3,419	R1	0-1-1	R1	0-0-1	R3	3-0-2	Dino Maamria; Martin Paterson
**2024–25**	**League One**	3	46	11	14	21	49	66	-17	47	**20th of 24**	Rumarn Burrell	10	3,254	R2	1-1-0	R1	0-0-1	R2	1-3-0	Mark Robinson; Tom Hounsell; Gary Bowyer
**2025–26**	**League One**	3	46	13	15	18	50	60	-10	54	**17th of 24**	Jake Beesley	13	3,995	R4	3-0-1	R2	0-1-1	G	1-0-2	Gary Bowyer

== Notes ==
- Source: Burton Albion at the Football Club History Database
