= List of Corby Town F.C. seasons =

Corby Town is an English football club based in Corby, Northamptonshire. They are currently members of the Northern Premier League Division One Midlands. The Steelmen play their home games at Steel Park.

== Key ==
Initials in the divisions column

- SFL = Southern Football League
- NPL = Northern Premier League

Key to positions and symbols

- 1st = Champions
- 2nd = Runners-up
- ↑ = Promoted
- ↓ = Relegated
- → = Transferred

Key to rounds

- EPR = Extra preliminary round
- PRE = Preliminary round
- QR1 = First qualifying round, etc.
- R1 = First round, etc.
- DNE = Did not enter
- N/A = Not applicable

== List ==
Year	League									Leading league scorer		FA Cup	FA Trophy	Average home attendance
Year	Division	P	W	D	L	F	A	Pts	Pos	Name	Goals	FA Cup	FA Trophy	Average home attendance
1948–49	United Counties League	38	16	4	18	89	91	36	11th			DNE	N/A (Note: The FA Trophy competition started in the 1969–70 season.)	
1949–50	United Counties League	40	24	6	10	100	56	54	3rd			QR4	N/A	
1950–51	United Counties League	34	26	4	4	123	34	56	1st			QR3	N/A	
1951–52	United Counties League →	38	28	3	7	126	60	59	1st			QR2	N/A	
1952–53	Midland League	46	28	12	6	112	60	68	2nd			QR3	N/A	
1953–54	Midland League	46	26	8	12	115	76	60	3rd			QR2	N/A	
1954–55	Midland League	46	17	14	15	73	81	48	12th			R1	N/A	
1955–56	Midland League	46	14	12	20	88	101	40	17th			QR4	N/A	
1956–57	Midland League	46	22	8	16	110	98	52	6th			QR4	N/A	
1957–58	Midland League →	46	21	7	18	106	111	49	8th			QR3	N/A	
1958–59	SFL North-West Division ↓	34	10	8	16	59	79	28	14th			QR2	N/A	
1959–60	SFL Division One	42	15	3	24	75	91	33	20th			QR3	N/A	
1960–61	SFL Division One	40	16	10	14	82	73	42	9th			QR1	N/A	
1961–62	SFL Division One	38	19	6	13	82	60	44	6th			QR4	N/A	
1962–63	SFL Division One	38	19	8	11	79	50	46	7th			QR4	N/A	
1963–64	SFL Division One	42	24	7	11	114	56	55	5th			R1	N/A	
1964–65	SFL Division One ↑	42	24	7	11	88	55	55	4th			R1	N/A	
1965–66	SFL Premier Division	42	16	9	17	66	73	41	12th			R3	N/A	
1966–67	SFL Premier Division	42	15	9	18	60	75	39	16th			QR4	N/A	
1967–68	SFL Premier Division ↓	42	7	13	22	40	77	27	20th			R1	N/A	
1968–69	SFL Division One	42	22	6	14	81	65	50	5th			QR4	N/A	
1969–70	SFL Division One	42	14	15	13	58	54	43	11th			QR2	R2	
1970–71	SFL Division One	38	14	8	16	57	60	36	13th			QR1	R1	
1971–72	SFL Division One North (Note: The Southern Football League Division One was split into Division One North and Division One South. Corby Town were placed in Division One North.)	34	15	9	10	47	35	39	8th			QR1	QR3	
1972–73	SFL Division One North	42	14	16	12	62	56	44	7th			QR2	QR3	
1973–74	SFL Division One North	42	12	11	19	40	57	35	16th			QR4	QR3	
1974–75	SFL Division One North	42	11	13	18	60	57	35	15th			QR4	PR	
1975–76	SFL Division One North	42	11	10	21	50	65	32	20th			QR1	R2	
1976–77	SFL Division One North	38	11	13	14	56	64	35	13th			QR2	QR2	
1977–78	SFL Division One North	38	9	17	12	46	48	35	14th			QR3	QR2	
1978–79	SFL Division One North	38	5	6	27	40	85	16	20th			PR	QR1	
1979–80	SFL Midland Division (Note: The Southern Football League was restructured after the creation of the Alliance Premier League. Corby Town were placed in the newly formed Midland Division.)	42	5	9	28	40	94	19	22nd			QR2	PR	
1980–81	SFL Midland Division	42	19	7	16	69	58	45	10th			QR4	QR2	
1981–82	SFL Midland Division	42	19	8	15	70	59	46	10th			QR4	QR1	
1982–83	SFL Premier Division (Note: The Southern Football League was restructured. Corby Town were placed in the reformed Premier Division)	38	12	11	15	58	67	47	15th			QR4	R1	
1983–84	SFL Premier Division	38	12	14	12	55	54	50	14th			QR3	DNE	
1984–85	SFL Premier Division	38	15	6	17	56	54	51	11th			QR3	QR2	
1985–86	SFL Premier Division	38	14	7	17	61	67	49	13th			QR3	R2	
1986–87	SFL Premier Division	42	14	17	11	65	51	59	9th			QR3	R3	
1987–88	SFL Premier Division	42	16	8	18	61	64	56	10th			QR1	R1	
1988–89	SFL Premier Division	42	14	11	17	55	59	53	16th			QR1	QR3	
1989–90	SFL Premier Division ↓	42	10	6	26	57	77	36	20th			QR1	QR1	
1990–91	SFL Midland Division ↑	42	27	4	11	99	48	85	2nd			QR3	QR1	
1991–92	SFL Premier Division	42	13	12	17	66	81	51	14th			QR3	QR1	
1992–93	SFL Premier Division	40	20	12	8	68	43	72	3rd			QR4	QR1	
1993–94	SFL Premier Division	42	17	8	17	52	56	59	9th			QR2	QR3	
1994–95	SFL Premier Division ↓	42	4	10	28	36	113	21 (Note: Corby Town was deducted one point.)	22nd			QR1	QR1	
1995–96	SFL Midland Division	42	9	7	26	52	95	34	20th			QR1	QR2	
1996–97	SFL Midland Division	40	8	8	24	49	88	32	20th			QR3	QR1	
1997–98	SFL Midland Division →	40	2	8	30	41	112	14	21st			QR1	QR3	
1998–99	SFL Southern Division	42	10	10	22	48	73	40	19th			PR	R2	
1999–2000	SFL Eastern Division (Note: The Southern Football League Southern Division was renamed Eastern Division)	42	11	12	19	56	62	42 (Note: Corby Town was deducted three points.)	21st			PR	R2	
2000–01	SFL Eastern Division	42	14	10	18	64	92	52	11th			QR1	R1	
2001–02	SFL Eastern Division	42	10	13	19	54	82	43	21st			PR	R1	
2002–03	SFL Eastern Division	42	9	11	22	49	84	38	19th			PR	R1	
2003–04	SFL Eastern Division →	42	12	9	21	44	75	45	15th			QR1	PR	
2004–05	SFL Western Division →	42	14	12	16	52	62	54	12th			PR	PR	
2005–06	SFL Eastern Division ↑	42	25	9	8	63	33	84	2nd			QR2	QR2	
2006–07	SFL Premier Division	42	10	9	23	52	69	39	20th			QR1	QR1	188
2007–08	SFL Premier Division	42	14	8	20	60	67	50	16th			QR4	QR2	235
2008–09	SFL Premier Division ↑	42	25	9	8	85	38	84	1st	Stephen Diggin	19	QR2	QR2	384
2009–10	Conference North	40	18	9	13	73	62	63	6th			QR2	R3	
2010–11	Conference North	40	13	10	17	58	80	49	13th			R1	QR3	
2011–12	Conference North	42	14	8	20	69	71	50	17th			R1	QR3	510
2012–13	Conference North ↓	42	12	8	22	66	92	44	20th			QR4	R2	459
2013–14	SFL Premier Division	44	18	6	20	65	68	60	11th	Greg Mills	11	R1	QR1	272
2014–15	SFL Premier Division ↑	44	29	7	8	86	47	94	1st	Spencer Weir-Daley	21	QR1	QR1	492
2015–16	National League North ↓	42	7	11	24	47	93	32	22nd	Greg Mills	16	QR2	QR3	
2016–17	NPL Premier Division ↓	46	12	10	24	49	72	46	21st			QR1	QR1	473
2017–18	NPL Division One South →	42	18	6	18	74	75	60	9th			PR	QR1	
2018–19	SFL Division One Central	38	24	5	9	106	60	77	3rd			QR3	PR	415
2019–20	SFL Division One Central	28	18	5	5	64	26	59	3rd (Note: As a result of the COVID-19 pandemic, this season's Southern Football League was formally abandoned on 26 March 2020, with all results from the season being expunged, and no promotion or relegation taking place.)			QR2	QR1	419
2020–21	SFL Division One Central →	7	5	0	2	15	8	15	1st (Note: As a result of the COVID-19 pandemic, this season's Southern Football League was curtailed on 24 February 2021.)			PR	QR3	
2021–22	NPL Division One Midlands	38	11	7	20	56	66	40	15th			QR2	QR3	
2022–23	NPL Division One Midlands	38	19	10	9	71	48	67	7th			EPR	QR1	
2023–24	NPL Division One Midlands	38	15	11	12	80	50	56	8th			PR	QR1	
2024-25	NPL Division One Midlands	40	27	4	9	84	40	85	2nd			EPR	QR2	
2025-26	NPL Division One Midlands	42	15	10	17	50	61	55	13th			QR1	R2	
