= List of Cambridge City F.C. seasons =

Cambridge City is an English football club currently playing in the Isthmian League North Division

== Key ==
Key to league record

- Level = Level of the league in the current league system
- Pld = Games played
- W = Games won
- D = Games drawn
- L = Games lost
- GF = Goals for
- GA = Goals against
- GD = Goals difference
- Pts = Points
- Position = Position in the final league table

Key to cup records

- PR = Premilinary round
- QR1 = Qualifying round 1
- QR2 = Qualifying round 2
- QR3 = Qualifying round 3
- QR4 = Qualifying round 4
- R1 = Round 1
- R2 = Round 2
- R3 = Round 3
- R4 = Round 4
- R5 = Round 5
- QF = Quarter-finals
- SF = Semi-finals
- RU = Runners-up
- WIN = Winners

== List of Seasons ==
Year	League	Level	Pld	W	D	L	GF	GA	GD	Pts	Position	FA Cup	FA Trophy / FA Amateur Cup	Notes
1914–15	Friendlies											QR1		
No games was played between 1915 and 1919 due to World War I
1919–20	Southern Amateur League; Division one / Bury & District League		12; 10	8; 6	4; 3	0; 1	39; 43	16; 13	+23 +30	20; 15	3rd of 8; 1st of 6	QR3	QR4	
1920–21	Southern Amateur League; Division one		20	16	2	2	57	14	+43	34	1st of 11			
1921–22	Southern Amateur League; Division one		20	9	5	6	37	29	+8	23	4th of 11	QR4	R1	
1922–23	Southern Amateur League; Division one		20	9	5	6	47	39	+8	23	4th of 11	QR1	QR3	
1923–24	Southern Amateur League; Division one		20	9	6	5	39	24	+15	24	4th of 11	PR	R3	
1924–25	Southern Amateur League; Division one		20	9	4	7	32	29	+3	22	7th of 11	QR1	R3	
1925–26	Southern Amateur League; Division one		22	9	5	8	65	55	+10	23	2nd of 12	QR4	R2	
1926–27	Southern Amateur League; Division one		22	9	4	9	45	42	+3	22	6th of 12	QR2	R1	
1927–28	Southern Amateur League; Division one		24	19	1	4	83	35	+48	39	1st of 13	QR3	SF	
1928–29	Southern Amateur League; Division one		22	20	2	0	86	22	+64	42	1st of 12	QR4	R1	
1929–30	Southern Amateur League; Division one		22	14	1	7	71	41	+30	29	3rd of 12	QR4	R2	
1930–31	Southern Amateur League; Division one		22	17	3	2	77	29	+48	37	1st of 12	QR1	R1	
1931–32	Southern Amateur League; Division one		22	15	4	3	67	36	+31	34	1st of 12	QR1	R2	
1932–33	Southern Amateur League; Division one		22	13	2	7	56	35	+21	28	4th of 12	QR1	R1	
1933–34	Southern Amateur League; Division one		22	10	3	9	49	42	+7	23	5th of 12	QR2	QR4	
1934–35	Southern Amateur League; Division one		22	13	2	7	48	30	+18	28	3rd of 12	QR2	R4	
1935–36	Spartan League; Premier Division		26	13	4	9	67	53	14	30	3rd of 14	QR3	R2	
1936–37	Spartan League; Premier Division		26	11	8	7	59	49	+10	30	6th of 14	QR4	R1	
1937–38	Spartan League; Premier Division		26	11	4	11	67	65	+2	26	8th of 14	QR1	R3	
1938–39	Spartan League; Premier Division		26	12	8	6	49	39	+10	32	5th of 14	QR3	R3	
1939–40	Spartan League; Premier Division		1	0	0	1	1	2	-1	0	Abandoned			Season abandoned due to World War II
1940–41	East Anglian League		6	5	1	0	33	6	+27	11	1st of 4			
1941–42	East Anglian League		10	8	1	1	48	11	+37	17	1st of 6			
1942–43	East Anglian League		10	8	1	1	57	10	+47	17	1st of 7			
1943–44	East Anglian League		11	10	0	1	39	16	+23	20	2nd of 9			
1944–45	East Anglian League		7	7	0	0	29	5	+24	14	1st of 5			
1945–46	Spartan League; Eastern Division		16	13	1	12	65	18	+47	27	1st of 9	QR3	R1	
1946–47	Spartan League; Eastern Division		26	13	3	10	95	40	+55	29	5th of 14	R1	R2	
1947–48	Spartan League; Eastern Division		26	21	2	3	97	34	+63	44	1st of 14	QR2	R3	
1948–49	Spartan League; Eastern Division		26	20	4	2	85	34	+51	44	1st of 14	R1	R2	
1949–50	Spartan League; Eastern Division		26	15	4	7	73	39	+34	34	2nd of 14	QR3	R3	
1950–51	Athenian League		30	8	7	15	49	72	-23	23	13th of 16		R2	Cambridge Town changed to Cambridge City
1951–52	Athenian League		30	6	8	16	44	70	-26	20	14th of 16		R1	
1952–53	Athenian League		26	11	2	13	38	38	0	24	8th of 14	QR2	R2	
1953–54	Athenian League		26	11	6	9	45	49	-4	28	7th of 14	QR2	R2	
1954–55	Athenian League		26	9	1	16	37	53	-16	19	13th of 14	QR1	R2	
1955–56	Athenian League		28	7	4	17	39	61	-22	18	14th of 15	PR	R2	
1956–57	Athenian League		28	11	4	13	48	62	-14	26	9th of 15	QR2	R1	
1957–58	Athenian League		30	7	5	18	74	82	-8	19	15th of 16	QR1	R1	Cambridge City elected to join the Southern Football League South-East Division
1958–59	Southern Football League South-East Division	5	32	12	7	13	61	54	+7	31	9th of 17	QR1		Premier Division was formed at the end of the previous season, with eleven top clubs from both North-West and South-East divisions joined
1959–60	Southern Football League Premier Division	5	42	18	11	13	81	72	+9	47	5th of 22	QR4		
1960–61	Southern Football League Premier Division	5	42	16	12	14	101	71	+30	44	7th of 22	QR3		
1961–62	Southern Football League Premier Division	5	42	18	8	16	70	71	-1	44	9th of 22	QR3		
1962–63	Southern Football League Premier Division	5	40	25	6	9	99	64	+35	56	1st of 21	QR3		
1963–64	Southern Football League Premier Division	5	42	17	9	16	76	70	+6	43	10th of 22	QR4		
1964–65	Southern Football League Premier Division	5	42	16	11	15	78	66	+12	43	9th of 22	QR3		
1965–66	Southern Football League Premier Division	5	42	19	11	12	67	52	+15	49	6th of 22	QR2		
1966–67	Southern Football League Premier Division	5	42	15	13	14	66	70	-4	43	12th of 22	R1		
1967–68	Southern Football League Premier Division	5	42	10	6	26	50	81	-31	26	21st of 22	QR4		
1968–69	Southern Football League Division One	6	42	18	10	14	73	63	+10	46	9th of 22	QR2		
1969–70	Southern Football League Division One	6	42	26	8	8	104	43	+61	60	2nd of 22; Promoted	QR4	QR3	
1970–71	Southern Football League Premier Division	5	42	22	11	9	66	38	+28	55	2nd of 22	QR4	QR3	
1971–72	Southern Football League Premier Division	5	42	12	14	16	68	71	-3	38	17th of 22	QR1	R1	
1972–73	Southern Football League Premier Division	5	42	14	15	13	64	53	+11	43	11th of 22	QR3	QR3	
1973–74	Southern Football League Premier Division	5	42	15	12	15	45	54	-9	42	10th of 22	QR1	QR3	
1974–75	Southern Football League Premier Division	5	42	11	14	17	51	56	-5	36	17th of 22	PR	QR3	
1975–76	Southern Football League Premier Division	5	42	8	15	19	41	67	-26	31	21st of 22	QR3	QR2	
1976–77	Southern Football League Division One North	6	38	17	10	11	68	43	+25	44	6th of 20	QR1	QR2	
1977–78	Southern Football League Division One North	6	38	14	12	12	56	45	+11	40	9th of 20	QR2	R1	
1978–79	Southern Football League Division One North	6	38	9	9	20	37	62	-25	27	17th of 20	PR	QR1	Southern Football League was restructured with Midland and Southern divisions replacing three old divisions
1979–80	Southern Football League Midland Division	6	42	6	9	27	30	73	-43	21	21st of 22	PR	QR1	
1980–81	Southern Football League Midland Division	6	42	8	12	22	46	87	-41	28	18th of 22	QR1	PR	
1981–82	Southern Football League Midland Division	6	42	10	8	24	38	80	-42	28	20th of 22	QR1	QR1	
1982–83	Southern Football League Southern Division	7	34	12	5	17	56	63	-7	41	12th of 18	PR	PR	
1983–84	Southern Football League Southern Division	7	38	13	9	16	43	53	-10	48	10th of 20	QR1	QR1	
1984–85	Southern Football League Southern Division	7	38	11	11	16	59	71	-12	44	15th of 20	QR2	QR2	
1985–86	Southern Football League Southern Division	7	40	23	11	6	87	41	+46	80	1st of 21; Champion	PR	QR1	
1986–87	Southern Football League Premier Division	6	42	14	20	8	68	52	+16	62	6th of 22	QR3	R2	
1987–88	Southern Football League Premier Division	6	42	24	8	10	84	43	+41	80	3rd of 22	QR2	R2	
1988–89	Southern Football League Premier Division	6	42	20	10	12	72	51	+21	70	5th of 22	QR2	QR3	
1989–90	Southern Football League Premier Division	6	42	17	11	14	76	56	+20	62	8th of 22	QR3	QR3	
1990–91	Southern Football League Premier Division	6	42	21	14	7	63	43	+20	77	3rd of 22	QR3	QR2	
1991–92	Southern Football League Premier Division	6	42	18	14	10	71	53	+18	68	5th of 22	QR1	QR3	
1992–93	Southern Football League Premier Division	6	40	14	10	16	62	73	-11	52	14th of 21	QR3	QR1	
1993–94	Southern Football League Premier Division	6	42	13	11	18	50	60	-10	50	17th of 22	R1	QR2	
1994–95	Southern Football League Premier Division	6	42	18	8	16	60	55	+5	62	9th of 22	QR3	QR2	
1995–96	Southern Football League Premier Division	6	42	12	10	20	56	68	-12	46	19th of 22	QR1	R1	
1996–97	Southern Football League Premier Division	6	42	11	13	18	57	65	-8	46	18th of 22	QR3	QR3	
1997–98	Southern Football League Premier Division	6	42	16	8	18	62	70	-8	56	13th of 22	QR2	R1	
1998–99	Southern Football League Premier Division	6	42	11	12	19	47	68	-21	45	20th of 22	QR2	R1	
1999–2000	Southern Football League Premier Division	6	42	14	10	18	52	66	-14	52	14th of 22	R1	R1	
2000–01	Southern Football League Premier Division	6	42	13	11	18	56	59	-3	50	16th of 22	QR4	R2	
2001–02	Southern Football League Premier Division	6	42	12	16	14	60	70	-10	52	14th of 22	R1	R3	
2002–03	Southern Football League Premier Division	6	42	13	10	19	54	56	-2	49	18th of 22	QR2	R2	
2003–04	Southern Football League Premier Division	6	42	14	15	13	54	53	+1	57	8th of 22; Conference South Formation	QR3	R1	Conference League increased its size by adding two lower divisions, the Conference North and Conference South respectively, with the original division being renamed Conference National
2004–05	Conference; South	6	42	23	6	13	60	44	+16	75	2nd of 22; Playoff semifinal	R2	R5	
2005–06	Conference; South	6	42	20	10	12	78	46	+32	67	7th of 22	R1	R3	
2006–07	Conference; South	6	42	15	7	20	44	52	-8	52	13th of 22	QR4	QR3	
2007–08	Conference; South	6	42	14	10	18	71	72	-1	52	14th of 22; Demoted	QR2	R2	Club was demoted for failing to comply to stadium regulations
2008–09	Southern Football League; Premier Division	7	42	21	10	11	62	40	+22	73	4th of 22; Playoff semifinal	QR2	R1	
2009–10	Southern Football League; Premier Division	7	42	18	17	7	73	44	+29	71	6th of 22	QR3	QR2	
2010–11	Southern Football League; Premier Division	7	40	24	7	9	74	40	+34	79	4th of 21; Playoff semifinal	QR3	QR3	
2011–12	Southern Football League; Premier Division	7	42	21	9	12	78	52	+26	72	5th of 22; Playoff semifinal	QR1	QR2	
2012–13	Southern Football League; Premier Division	7	42	20	6	16	63	57	+6	66	8th of 22	R1	QR1	
2013–14	Southern Football League; Premier Division	7	44	27	7	10	95	49	+46	88	3rd of 23; Playoff semifinal	QR2	QR2	
2014–15	Southern Football League; Premier Division	7	44	14	15	15	71	62	+9	57	13th of 23	QR1	QR1	
2015–16	Southern Football League; Premier Division	7	46	15	7	24	63	80	-17	52	18th of 24	QR1	QR1	
2016–17	Southern Football League; Premier Division	7	46	12	11	23	46	72	-26	47	21st of 24; Relegated	QR2	QR1	
2017–18	Southern Football League; Division One East	8	42	23	8	11	99	53	+46	77	6th of 22; Playoff Finalist	QR2	QR1	
2018–19	Southern Football League; Division One Central	8	38	12	11	15	58	54	+4	47	12th of 20	QR1	QR1	
2019–20	Isthmian League; North Division	8	28	12	3	13	42	39	+3	39	9th of 20	PR	QR1	Competition abandoned due to COVID-19 pandemic
2020–21	Isthmian League; North Division	8	4	2	0	2	3	3	0	6	17th of 20	QR4	QR1	Competition abandoned due to COVID-19 pandemic
2021–22	Northern Premier League; Division One Midlands	8	38	15	9	14	60	58	+2	54	9th of 20	QR1	QR2	
2022–23	Northern Premier League; Division One Midlands	8	38	11	11	16	43	51	-8	44	14th of 20	PR	QR2	
2023–24	Northern Premier League; Division One Midlands	8	38	8	8	22	46	81	-35	32	17th of 20	QR3	QR2	
2024–25	Isthmian League; North Division	8	42	17	9	16	64	62	+2	60	11th of 22	PR	R1	
2025–26	Isthmian League; North Division	8	42	14	14	14	58	49	+9	56	12th of 22	PR	QR2	
