= Wes Maughan =

English footballer (born 1939)

Personal information
- Full name: Wesley James Maughan
- Date of birth: 17 February 1939 (age 87)
- Place of birth: Sholing, England
- Height: 5 ft 9 in (1.75 m)
- Position: Inside forward

Youth career
- 1955–1956: Cowes

Senior career*
Years	Team	Apps	(Gls)
1956–1962	Southampton	6	(1)
1962–1963	Reading	16	(3)
1963–1965	Chelmsford City		
1965–1966	Cambridge United		
1966–1968	Brentwood Town		
1968	→ Margate (loan)		
1968	Chelmsford City		
1968–1972	Bexley United		
1972–1973	Basingstoke Town		
1973–1974	Fleet Town		
1974–1975	Bexley United		
- * Club domestic league appearances and goals

Wesley James Maughan (born 17 February 1939) is an English retired footballer who played as an inside-forward for Southampton and Reading in The Football League in the 1950s and 1960s, before a long career in non-league football. He is currently the secretary of a charity which helps disabled and deprived children in Kenya and a lifelong Salvationist.

== Playing career ==
Although he was born in the Sholing area of Southampton, Maughan was brought up on the Isle of Wight where he attended Cowes Secondary Modern School. After leaving school he became a trainee accountant and played football for Cowes, breaking into their first-team when he was 16. In a match between the Isle of Wight Youth team and Southampton Youths, he scored four goals in a 6–1 victory and was promptly signed by Southampton's manager Ted Bates.

In 1957, he was part of the Southampton Youth team which made their first entry into the FA Youth Cup, scoring 11 goals as the team reached the semi-final, where they were eliminated by Manchester United on aggregate, despite a victory at Old Trafford in which Maugham scored twice. Maughan signed a professional contract in May 1957 and scored 47 goals in 101 appearances for Southampton's reserves.

He made his first-team debut on 21 February 1959, when he took the place of the injured Charlie Livesey as centre-forward for a 4–1 defeat at Reading. In February 1960, he managed three consecutive matches in place of the suspended George O'Brien, but in five years at The Dell he only made eight appearances, scoring once (in a 2–1 defeat at Sheffield United on 15 April 1961). Despite being described in his early days as "a real 90-minute player" with "pace and ability", he only made seven first-team appearances in six years with the Saints.

In March 1962, he was sold to Reading for a fee of £4,000. Reading quickly discovered that Maughan had problems with his eyesight and demanded, unsuccessfully, a refund of part of the transfer fee. He stayed at Elm Park for a season, in which he only managed 16 League appearances, scoring three goals.

After leaving Reading in the summer of 1963, Maughan dropped into non-league football initially in East Anglia, followed by four years at Bexley United, before returning to Hampshire in 1972, where he played for Basingstoke Town.

== Later career ==
In 1974, he briefly returned to Bexley United as a coach for the reserve team.

In 2000, he was living near Sunbury-on-Thames, working part-time as an IT consultant. In 2013, he was living near Heathrow Airport. A lifelong member of The Salvation Army, Maughan was still playing the trombone for the Army's band at Staines. Between 2008 and 2012 he coached their football team, SA Stainash, in the East Berkshire Football League.

He continues to be a season ticket holder at St Mary's Stadium, although his involvement as secretary of The Kenya Trust can cause him to miss some of Southampton's home matches.

He is secretary of the Kenya Trust, a Salvation Army charity which was established in 2004 to help disabled and deprived children in Kenya. He also leads the Salvation Army's Men's Fellowship at Staines, and organises the annual "Into Africa" fund-raising concert, which in September 2014 raised over £4,500 to invest in infrastructure and building projects in Kenya.

== Bibliography ==
- Chalk, Gary; Holley, Duncan; Bull, David (2013). All the Saints – A Complete Players' Who's Who of Southampton FC. Hagiology Publishing. ISBN 978-0-9926864-0-6.
- Holley, Duncan; Chalk, Gary (1992). The Alphabet of the Saints. ACL & Polar Publishing. ISBN 0-9514862-3-3.
- Holley, Duncan; Chalk, Gary (2003). In That Number – A Post-war Chronicle of Southampton FC. Hagiology Publishing. ISBN 0-9534474-3-X.
- Hugman, Barry (1981). Football League Players Records (1946–1981). Aylesbury: Rothmans Publications. ISBN 0-907574-08-4.
