= 1957–58 Southern Football League =

The 1957–58 Southern Football League season was the 55th in the history of the league, an English football competition.

After Llanelly left the league at the end of the previous season, the league consisted of 21 clubs from previous season plus Poole Town, who were elected from the Western League. Gravesend & Northfleet were champions, winning their first Southern League title. Six Southern League clubs applied to join the Football League at the end of the season, but none were successful.

The following season the league split into two divisions, a North-West Division and a South-East Division, with thirteen new clubs elected to make up the numbers.

== League table ==
Southern Football League
- Season: 1957–58
- Champions: Gravesend & Northfleet
- Matches: 462
- Goals: 1,769 (3.83 per match)

Pos	Team	Pld	W	D	L	GF	GA	GR	Pts	Results
1	Gravesend & Northfleet	42	27	5	10	109	71	1.535	59	Placed in South-East Division
2	Bedford Town	42	25	7	10	112	64	1.750	57	Placed in South-East Division
3	Chelmsford City	42	24	9	9	93	57	1.632	57	Placed in South-East Division
4	Weymouth	42	25	5	12	90	61	1.475	55	Placed in South-East Division
5	Worcester City	42	23	7	12	95	59	1.610	53	Placed in North-West Division
6	Cheltenham Town	42	21	10	11	115	66	1.742	52	Placed in North-West Division
7	Hereford United	42	21	6	15	79	56	1.411	48	Placed in North-West Division
8	Kettering Town	42	18	9	15	99	76	1.303	45	Placed in North-West Division
9	Headington United	42	18	7	17	90	83	1.084	43	Placed in North-West Division
10	Poole Town	42	17	9	16	82	81	1.012	43	Placed in South-East Division
11	Hastings United	42	13	15	14	78	77	1.013	41	Placed in South-East Division
12	Gloucester City	42	17	7	18	70	70	1.000	41	Placed in North-West Division
13	Yeovil Town	42	16	9	17	70	84	0.833	41	Placed in South-East Division
14	Dartford	42	14	9	19	66	92	0.717	37	Placed in South-East Division
15	Lovells Athletic	42	15	6	21	60	83	0.723	36	Placed in North-West Division
16	Bath City	42	13	9	20	65	64	1.016	35	Placed in North-West Division
17	Guildford City	42	12	10	20	58	92	0.630	34	Placed in South-East Division
18	Tonbridge	42	13	7	22	77	100	0.770	33	Placed in South-East Division
19	Exeter City II	42	12	8	22	60	94	0.638	32	Placed in South-East Division
20	Barry Town	42	11	9	22	72	101	0.713	31	Placed in North-West Division
21	Kidderminster Harriers	42	10	10	22	60	101	0.594	30	Placed in North-West Division
22	Merthyr Tydfil	42	9	3	30	69	137	0.504	21	Placed in North-West Division

Source: rsssf.com
Rules for classification: 1) points; 2) goal ratio.

== Football League elections ==
Six Southern League clubs applied for election to the Football League. However, none were successful as all four League clubs were re-elected.

Club	League	Votes
Millwall	Football League	46
Exeter City	Football League	43
Southport	Football League	41
Crewe Alexandra	Football League	35
Peterborough United	Midland League	15
Wigan Athletic	Lancashire Combination	4
Hereford United	Southern League	3
Bedford Town	Southern League	2
Headington United	Southern League	2
King's Lynn	Midland League	2
Kettering Town	Southern League	1
Burton Albion	Birmingham & District League	0
Gloucester City	Southern League	0
Morecambe	Lancashire Combination	0
South Shields	North Eastern League	0
Yeovil Town	Southern League	0
