= Old Road Ground =

Sports venue in Clacton-on-Sea, Essex, England

- Location: Clacton-on-Sea, Essex
- Coordinates: 51°47′24″N 1°08′47″E
- Closed: 1987

Tenants
- Clacton Cricket Club; Clacton St Paul's Cricket Club (1918–1923); Clacton Town (1935–1937, 1938–1958, 1964–1987)

Old Road Ground, also known as the Clacton Greyhound Stadium, was a cricket, football, and greyhound racing stadium in Clacton-on-Sea, Essex.

== Origins and opening ==
The Old Road Ground was located south of the gas works and water works on Anchor Road and was originally used by Clacton Cricket Club. In 1905, Clacton Town was invited to use the ground and a wooden stand was built. The cricket club later folded and was replaced by Clacton St Paul's between 1918 and 1923. The council, which owned the ground, forced it to be rebuilt in 1935 so that a new car park could be put in its place. As a result, the pitch was shifted fifty yards to the west. A new wooden stand was erected for Clacton's first match in the new Eastern Counties League on 31 August 1935, with the original stand in one corner of the ground and an uncommissioned railcar being used as changing rooms.

A new 500+ seat concrete stand was built after World War II, with a covered terrace built in the southeast corner in the 1950s. A further covered terrace had been installed by the time the greyhound racing arrived in 1967. Clacton's record attendance at the ground of 3,505 was set for an FA Cup match against Romford in September 1952.

== Greyhound racing ==
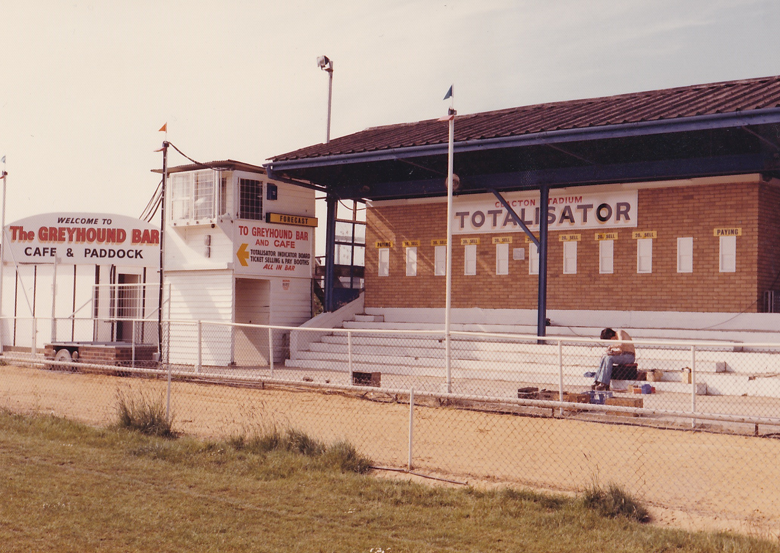
Clacton Greyhound Stadium (Old Road Ground) c.1970

In 1967, the council constructed a greyhound track around the outside of the existing football pitch used by Clacton Town. This action required the stands to be dismantled and the pitch to be shifted once again. The back straight (or far terracing) became inaccessible and a totalisator office was built on the end of the main stand, another alteration was the permanent addition of a portakabin used as the Greyhound Bar and Café. The changing face of the ground did not please the football supporters and when in 1974 the council gave six months' notice to the club, the outlook was bleak. However, the council subsequently offered a recurring one year licence afterwards.

The tourism boom in Clacton-on-Sea had reached its crescendo by 1970 but the greyhound operation continued for over a decade using an 'Outside Sumner' hare and race distances of 240, 450 & 650 yards.

On 3 August 1984, the management headed by General Manager Mr. J. Carolan and Racing Manager John Old joined the National Greyhound Racing Club (NGRC) bringing affiliation to a governing body but also increasing costs. The race distances were 213, 404, 570, 760 & 925 metres.

== Closure ==
In 1985, the council announced that they planned to sell the nine-acre site to developers who wished to build a retail park. The last football game took place on 21 February 1987 and the final greyhound meeting occurred one week later on 27 February 1987.

The site was demolished the same year and turned into the retail park. The site today is between Halfords and Morrisons.
