= 1960–61 Southern Football League =

The 1960–61 Southern Football League season was the 58th in the history of the league, an English football competition.

Oxford United won the championship, whilst Kettering Town, Cambridge United, Bexleyheath & Welling and Merthyr Tydfil were all promoted to the Premier Division. Ten Southern League clubs applied to join the Football League at the end of the season, but none were successful.

== Premier Division ==
The Premier Division consisted of 22 clubs, including 18 clubs from the previous season and four new clubs, promoted from Division One:

- Clacton Town
- Folkestone Town
- Guildford City
- Romford

=== League table ===
Southern Football League Premier Division
- Season: 1960–61
- Champions: Oxford United
- Relegated: Dartford; Hastings United; Wisbech Town
- Matches: 462
- Goals: 1,697 (3.67 per match)

Pos	Team	Pld	W	D	L	GF	GA	GR	Pts	Promotion or relegation
1	Oxford United	42	27	10	5	104	43	2.419	64	
2	Chelmsford City	42	23	11	8	91	55	1.655	57	
3	Yeovil Town	42	23	9	10	109	54	2.019	55	
4	Hereford United	42	21	10	11	83	67	1.239	52	
5	Weymouth	42	21	9	12	78	63	1.238	51	
6	Bath City	42	18	14	10	74	52	1.423	50	
7	Cambridge City	42	16	12	14	101	71	1.423	44	
8	Wellington Town	42	17	9	16	66	68	0.971	43	
9	Bedford Town	42	18	7	17	94	97	0.969	43	
10	Folkestone Town	42	18	7	17	75	86	0.872	43	
11	King's Lynn	42	13	16	13	68	66	1.030	42	
12	Worcester City	42	15	11	16	69	69	1.000	41	
13	Clacton Town	42	15	11	16	82	83	0.988	41	
14	Romford	42	13	15	14	66	69	0.957	41	
15	Guildford City	42	14	11	17	65	62	1.048	39	
16	Tonbridge	42	16	6	20	79	85	0.929	38	
17	Cheltenham Town	42	15	7	20	81	81	1.000	37	
18	Gravesend & Northfleet	42	15	7	20	75	101	0.743	37	
19	Dartford	42	13	11	18	57	90	0.633	37	Relegated to Division One
20	Hastings United	42	8	9	25	60	100	0.600	25	Relegated to Division One
21	Wisbech Town	42	9	6	27	58	112	0.518	24	Relegated to Division One
22	Boston United	42	6	8	28	62	123	0.504	20	Resigned from the league

Source: rsssf.com
Rules for classification: 1) points; 2) goal ratio.

== Division One ==
Division One consisted of 21 clubs, including 16 clubs from the previous season and five new clubs:

- Four clubs relegated from the Premier Division:
  - Barry Town
  - Kettering Town
  - Nuneaton Borough
  - Poole Town
- Plus:
  - Canterbury City, elected from the Metropolitan League

=== League table ===
Southern Football League Division One
- Season: 1960–61
- Champions: Kettering Town
- Promoted: Kettering Town; Cambridge United; Bexleyheath & Welling; Merthyr Tydfil
- Matches: 420
- Goals: 1,513 (3.6 per match)

Pos	Team	Pld	W	D	L	GF	GA	GR	Pts	Promotion or relegation
1	Kettering Town	40	26	7	7	100	55	1.818	59	Promoted to the Premier Division
2	Cambridge United	40	25	5	10	100	53	1.887	55	Promoted to the Premier Division
3	Bexleyheath & Welling	40	22	8	10	93	46	2.022	52	Promoted to the Premier Division
4	Merthyr Tydfil	40	23	6	11	88	65	1.354	52	Promoted to the Premier Division
5	Sittingbourne	40	21	10	9	77	63	1.222	52	
6	Hinckley Athletic	40	17	13	10	74	59	1.254	47	
7	Ramsgate Athletic	40	19	7	14	77	56	1.375	45	
8	Rugby Town	40	18	9	13	89	71	1.254	45	
9	Corby Town	40	16	10	14	82	73	1.123	42	
10	Poole Town	40	18	5	17	71	65	1.092	41	
11	Barry Town	40	16	9	15	65	74	0.878	41	
12	Yiewsley	40	17	7	16	65	76	0.855	41	
13	Trowbridge Town	40	14	10	16	71	73	0.973	38	
14	Ashford Town (Kent)	40	14	8	18	61	67	0.910	36	
15	Margate	40	11	12	17	62	75	0.827	34	
16	Dover	40	12	7	21	67	74	0.905	31	
17	Canterbury City	40	10	10	20	52	75	0.693	30	
18	Nuneaton Borough	40	11	7	22	60	91	0.659	29	
19	Burton Albion	40	12	4	24	63	85	0.741	28	
20	Tunbridge Wells United	40	8	5	27	56	115	0.487	21	
21	Gloucester City	40	7	7	26	40	102	0.392	21	

Source: rsssf.com
Rules for classification: 1) points; 2) goal ratio.

== Football League elections ==
Ten Southern League clubs (including Bexleyheath & Welling and Kettering Town from Division One) applied for election to the Football League. However, all four League clubs were re-elected.

Club	League	Votes
Chester	Football League	45
Exeter City	Football League	44
Barrow	Football League	35
Hartlepools United	Football League	32
Oxford United	Southern League	19
Bedford Town	Southern League	4
Wigan Athletic	Lancashire Combination	4
Cambridge City	Southern League	3
Chelmsford City	Southern League	3
Gateshead	Northern Counties League	3
Hereford United	Southern League	1
Kettering Town	Southern League	1
Romford	Southern League	1
Scarborough	Northern Counties League	1
South Shields	Northern Counties League	1
Bexleyheath & Welling	Southern League	0
Gravesend & Northfleet	Southern League	0
King's Lynn	Southern League	0
Morecambe	Lancashire Combination	0
