= 1964–65 Southern Football League =

The 1964–65 Southern Football League season was the 62nd in the history of the league, an English football competition.

Weymouth won the championship, whilst Corby Town, Hereford United, Poole Town and Wimbledon were all promoted to the Premier Division. Nine Southern League clubs applied to join the Football League at the end of the season, but none were successful.

== Premier Division ==
The Premier Division consisted of 22 clubs, including 18 clubs from the previous season and four new clubs, promoted from Division One:

- Cheltenham Town
- Folkestone Town
- King's Lynn
- Tonbridge

=== League table ===
Southern Football League Premier Division
- Season: 1964–65
- Champions: Weymouth
- Relegated: Bath City; Bexley United; Hastings United; Wisbech Town
- Matches: 462
- Goals: 1,590 (3.44 per match)

Pos	Team	Pld	W	D	L	GF	GA	GR	Pts	Promotion or relegation
1	Weymouth	42	24	8	10	99	50	1.980	56	
2	Guildford City	42	21	12	9	73	49	1.490	54	
3	Worcester City	42	22	6	14	100	62	1.613	50	
4	Yeovil Town	42	18	14	10	76	55	1.382	50	
5	Chelmsford City	42	21	8	13	86	77	1.117	50	
6	Margate	42	20	9	13	88	79	1.114	49	
7	Dartford	42	17	11	14	74	64	1.156	45	
8	Nuneaton Borough	42	19	7	16	57	55	1.036	45	
9	Cambridge City	42	16	11	15	78	66	1.182	43	
10	Bedford Town	42	17	9	16	66	70	0.943	43	
11	Cambridge United	42	16	9	17	72	69	1.043	41	
12	Cheltenham Town	42	15	11	16	72	78	0.923	41	
13	Folkestone Town	42	17	7	18	72	79	0.911	41	
14	Romford	42	17	7	18	61	70	0.871	41	
15	King's Lynn	42	13	13	16	56	79	0.709	39	
16	Tonbridge	42	10	16	16	66	75	0.880	36	
17	Wellington Town	42	13	10	19	63	78	0.808	36	
18	Rugby Town	42	15	6	21	71	98	0.724	36	
19	Wisbech Town	42	14	6	22	75	91	0.824	34	Relegated to Division One
20	Bexley United	42	14	5	23	67	74	0.905	33	Relegated to Division One
21	Hastings United	42	9	14	19	58	86	0.674	32	Relegated to Division One
22	Bath City	42	13	3	26	60	86	0.698	29	Relegated to Division One

Source: fchd.com rsssf.com
Rules for classification: 1) points; 2) goal ratio.

== Division One ==
Division One consisted of 22 clubs, including 17 clubs from the previous season and five new clubs:

- Four clubs relegated from the Premier Division:
  - Hereford United
  - Hinckley Athletic
  - Kettering Town
  - Merthyr Tydfil
- Plus:
  - Wimbledon, transferred from the Isthmian League

Also, Yiewsley changed name to Hillingdon Borough.

=== League table ===
Southern Football League Division One
- Season: 1964–65
- Champions: Hereford United
- Promoted: Corby Town; Hereford United; Poole Town; Wimbledon
- Matches: 462
- Goals: 1,620 (3.51 per match)

Pos	Team	Pld	W	D	L	GF	GA	GR	Pts	Promotion or relegation
1	Hereford United	42	34	4	4	124	39	3.179	72	Promoted to the Premier Division
2	Wimbledon	42	24	13	5	108	52	2.077	61	Promoted to the Premier Division
3	Poole Town	42	26	6	10	92	56	1.643	58	Promoted to the Premier Division
4	Corby Town	42	24	7	11	88	55	1.600	55	Promoted to the Premier Division
5	Stevenage Town	42	19	13	10	83	43	1.930	51	
6	Hillingdon Borough	42	21	7	14	105	63	1.667	49	
7	Crawley Town	42	22	5	15	83	52	1.596	49	
8	Merthyr Tydfil	42	20	9	13	75	59	1.271	49	
9	Gloucester City	42	19	10	13	68	65	1.046	48	
10	Burton Albion	42	20	7	15	83	75	1.107	47	
11	Canterbury City	42	13	16	13	73	53	1.377	42	
12	Kettering Town	42	14	13	15	74	64	1.156	41	
13	Ramsgate Athletic	42	16	8	18	51	59	0.864	40	
14	Dover	42	14	10	18	54	59	0.915	38	
15	Hinckley Athletic	42	13	9	20	57	81	0.704	35	
16	Trowbridge Town	42	13	5	24	68	106	0.642	31	
17	Ashford Town (Kent)	42	11	8	23	60	98	0.612	30	
18	Barry Town	42	11	7	24	47	103	0.456	29	
19	Deal Town	42	7	13	22	61	127	0.480	27	
20	Tunbridge Wells Rangers	42	10	6	26	51	107	0.477	26	
21	Gravesend & Northfleet	42	9	7	26	57	101	0.564	25	
22	Sittingbourne	42	8	5	29	58	103	0.563	21	

Source: fchd.com rsssf.com
Rules for classification: 1) points; 2) goal ratio.

== Football League elections ==
Alongside the four League clubs facing re-election, a total of 14 non-League clubs applied for election, including nine Southern League clubs. All four League clubs were re-elected.

Club	League	Votes
Lincoln City	Football League	48
Stockport County	Football League	45
Barrow	Football League	41
Halifax Town	Football League	41
Bedford Town	Southern League	4
Gateshead	Northern League	4
Guildford City	Southern League	3
Hereford United	Southern League	2
Wigan Athletic	Cheshire League	2
Cambridge United	Southern League	1
Morecambe	Lancashire Combination	1
Romford	Southern League	1
South Shields	North Eastern League	1
Wellington Town	Southern League	1
Wimbledon	Southern League	1
Bexley United	Southern League	0
Corby Town	Southern League	0
New Brighton	Lancashire Combination	0
