= 1961–62 Southern Football League =

The 1961–62 Southern Football League season was the 59th in the history of the league, an English football competition.

Oxford United won the championship for the second successive season and was admitted to the Football League.

== Premier Division ==
The Premier Division consisted of 22 clubs, including 18 clubs from the previous season and four new clubs, promoted from Division One:

- Bexleyheath & Welling
- Cambridge United
- Kettering Town
- Merthyr Tydfil

=== League table ===
Southern Football League Premier Division
- Season: 1961–62
- Champions: Oxford United
- Relegated: Tonbridge; King's Lynn; Folkestone Town; Cheltenham Town
- Matches: 462
- Goals: 1,635 (3.54 per match)

Pos	Team	Pld	W	D	L	GF	GA	GR	Pts	Promotion or relegation
1	Oxford United	42	28	5	9	118	46	2.565	61	Elected to the Football League Fourth Division
2	Bath City	42	25	7	10	102	70	1.457	57	
3	Guildford City	42	24	8	10	79	49	1.612	56	
4	Yeovil Town	42	23	8	11	97	59	1.644	54	
5	Chelmsford City	42	19	12	11	74	60	1.233	50	
6	Weymouth	42	20	7	15	80	64	1.250	47	
7	Kettering Town	42	21	5	16	90	84	1.071	47	
8	Hereford United	42	21	2	19	81	68	1.191	44	
9	Cambridge City	42	18	8	16	70	71	0.986	44	
10	Bexleyheath & Welling	42	19	5	18	69	75	0.920	43	
11	Romford	42	15	9	18	63	70	0.900	39	
12	Cambridge United	42	13	12	17	76	78	0.974	38	
13	Wellington Town	42	14	10	18	75	78	0.962	38	
14	Gravesend & Northfleet	42	17	4	21	59	92	0.641	38	
15	Bedford Town	42	16	5	21	73	79	0.924	37	
16	Worcester City	42	15	7	20	51	64	0.797	37	
17	Merthyr Tydfil	42	13	11	18	62	80	0.775	37	
18	Clacton Town	42	13	10	19	74	91	0.813	36	
19	Tonbridge	42	10	14	18	71	92	0.772	34	Relegated to Division One
20	King's Lynn	42	12	8	22	59	74	0.797	32	Relegated to Division One
21	Folkestone Town	42	12	6	24	64	103	0.621	30	Relegated to Division One
22	Cheltenham Town	42	9	7	26	48	86	0.558	25	Relegated to Division One

Source: rsssf.com
Rules for classification: 1) points; 2) goal ratio.

== Division One ==
Division One consisted of 20 clubs, including 17 clubs from the previous season and three new clubs, relegated from the Premier Division:

- Dartford
- Hastings United
- Wisbech Town

=== League table ===
Southern Football League Division One
- Season: 1961–62
- Champions: Wisbech Town
- Promoted: Wisbech Town; Poole Town; Dartford; Rugby Town
- Matches: 380
- Goals: 1,319 (3.47 per match)

Pos	Team	Pld	W	D	L	GF	GA	GR	Pts	Promotion or relegation
1	Wisbech Town	38	21	11	6	76	42	1.810	53	Promoted to the Premier Division
2	Poole Town	38	23	6	9	81	47	1.723	52	Promoted to the Premier Division
3	Dartford	38	21	8	9	89	50	1.780	50	Promoted to the Premier Division
4	Rugby Town	38	20	9	9	82	49	1.673	49	Promoted to the Premier Division
5	Margate	38	20	6	12	74	55	1.345	46	
6	Corby Town	38	19	6	13	82	60	1.367	44	
7	Sittingbourne	38	16	12	10	69	51	1.353	44	
8	Dover	38	19	6	13	66	55	1.200	44	
9	Yiewsley	38	18	6	14	64	51	1.255	42	
10	Barry Town	38	14	11	13	55	51	1.078	39	
11	Ashford Town (Kent)	38	14	11	13	66	70	0.943	39	
12	Hinckley Athletic	38	15	8	15	75	65	1.154	38	
13	Burton Albion	38	16	5	17	70	79	0.886	37	
14	Nuneaton Borough	38	12	12	14	63	71	0.887	36	
15	Tunbridge Wells United	38	12	7	19	61	85	0.718	31	
16	Canterbury City	38	11	8	19	60	82	0.732	30	
17	Ramsgate Athletic	38	10	9	19	49	70	0.700	29	
18	Trowbridge Town	38	9	9	20	45	67	0.672	27	
19	Gloucester City	38	6	4	28	46	104	0.442	16	
20	Hastings United	38	5	4	29	46	115	0.400	14	

Source: rsssf.com
Rules for classification: 1) points; 2) goal ratio.

== Football League elections ==
Due to the resignation of Accrington Stanley there was a free place in the Football League. Alongside the three League clubs facing re-election, a total of 26 non-League clubs applied for election, including 19 Southern League clubs. Southern League champions Oxford United were the only non-League club to be elected.

Club	League	Votes
Chester	Football League	46
Doncaster Rovers	Football League	45
Hartlepools	Football League	40
Oxford United	Southern League	39
Wigan Athletic	Cheshire League	5
Chelmsford City	Southern League	4
Gateshead	Northern Counties League	4
Cambridge City	Southern League	2
Worcester City	Southern League	2
Bath City	Southern League	1
Hereford United	Southern League	1
King's Lynn	Southern League	1
Morecambe	Lancashire Combination	1
New Brighton	Lancashire Combination	1
Bedford Town	Southern League	0
Bexleyheath & Welling	Southern League	0
Corby Town	Southern League	0
Folkestone Town	Southern League	0
Gravesend & Northfleet	Southern League	0
Guildford City	Southern League	0
Kettering Town	Southern League	0
North Shields	Northern Counties League	0
Poole Town	Southern League	0
Romford	Southern League	0
Scarborough	Northern Counties League	0
Sittingbourne	Southern League	0
South Shields	Midland League	0
Wellington Town	Southern League	0
Yeovil Town	Southern League	0
