= 1962–63 Southern Football League =

The 1962–63 Southern Football League season was the 60th in the history of the league, an English football competition.

Cambridge City won the championship, whilst Hastings United, Hinckley Athletic, Margate and Nuneaton Borough were all promoted to the Premier Division. Seven Southern League clubs applied to join the Football League at the end of the season, but none were successful.

== Premier Division ==
After Oxford United were elected to the Football League at the end за the previous season, the Premier Division consisted of 21 clubs, including 17 clubs from the previous season and four new clubs, promoted from Division One:

- Dartford
- Poole Town
- Rugby Town
- Wisbech Town

At the end of the season, Bexleyheath & Welling changed name to Bexley United.

=== League table ===
Southern Football League Premier Division
- Season: 1962–63
- Champions: Cambridge City
- Relegated: Clacton Town; Gravesend & Northfleet; Poole Town
- Matches: 420
- Goals: 1,349 (3.21 per match)

| Pos | Team | Pld | W | D | L | GF | GA | GR | Pts | Promotion or relegation |
|---|---|---|---|---|---|---|---|---|---|---|
| 1 | Cambridge City | 40 | 25 | 6 | 9 | 99 | 64 | 1.547 | 56 | |
| 2 | Cambridge United | 40 | 23 | 7 | 10 | 74 | 50 | 1.480 | 53 | |
| 3 | Weymouth | 40 | 20 | 11 | 9 | 82 | 43 | 1.907 | 51 | |
| 4 | Guildford City | 40 | 20 | 11 | 9 | 70 | 50 | 1.400 | 51 | |
| 5 | Kettering Town | 40 | 22 | 7 | 11 | 66 | 49 | 1.347 | 51 | |
| 6 | Wellington Town | 40 | 19 | 9 | 12 | 71 | 49 | 1.449 | 47 | |
| 7 | Dartford | 40 | 19 | 9 | 12 | 61 | 54 | 1.130 | 47 | |
| 8 | Chelmsford City | 40 | 18 | 10 | 12 | 63 | 50 | 1.260 | 46 | |
| 9 | Bedford Town | 40 | 18 | 8 | 14 | 61 | 45 | 1.356 | 44 | |
| 10 | Bath City | 40 | 18 | 6 | 16 | 58 | 56 | 1.036 | 42 | |
| 11 | Yeovil Town | 40 | 15 | 10 | 15 | 64 | 54 | 1.185 | 40 | |
| 12 | Romford | 40 | 14 | 11 | 15 | 73 | 68 | 1.074 | 39 | |
| 13 | Bexleyheath & Welling | 40 | 13 | 11 | 16 | 55 | 63 | 0.873 | 37 | |
| 14 | Hereford United | 40 | 14 | 7 | 19 | 56 | 66 | 0.848 | 35 | |
| 15 | Merthyr Tydfil | 40 | 15 | 4 | 21 | 54 | 71 | 0.761 | 34 | |
| 16 | Rugby Town | 40 | 14 | 5 | 21 | 65 | 76 | 0.855 | 33 | |
| 17 | Wisbech Town | 40 | 15 | 3 | 22 | 64 | 84 | 0.762 | 33 | |
| 18 | Worcester City | 40 | 12 | 9 | 19 | 47 | 65 | 0.723 | 33 | |
| 19 | Poole Town | 40 | 10 | 12 | 18 | 54 | 66 | 0.818 | 32 | Relegated to Division One |
| 20 | Gravesend & Northfleet | 40 | 10 | 3 | 27 | 62 | 91 | 0.681 | 23 | Relegated to Division One |
| 21 | Clacton Town | 40 | 3 | 7 | 30 | 50 | 135 | 0.370 | 13 | Relegated to Division One |

Source: rsssf.com
Rules for classification: 1) points; 2) goal ratio.

== Division One ==
Division One consisted of 20 clubs, including 16 clubs from the previous season and four new clubs, relegated from the Premier Division:

- Cheltenham Town
- Folkestone Town
- King's Lynn
- Tonbridge

At the end of the season, Tunbridge Wells United changed name to Tunbridge Wells Rangers.

=== League table ===
Southern Football League Division One
- Season: 1962–63
- Champions: Margate
- Promoted: Hastings United; Hinckley Athletic; Margate; Nuneaton Borough
- Matches: 380
- Goals: 1,281 (3.37 per match)

| Pos | Team | Pld | W | D | L | GF | GA | GR | Pts | Promotion or relegation |
|---|---|---|---|---|---|---|---|---|---|---|
| 1 | Margate | 38 | 21 | 13 | 4 | 86 | 47 | 1.830 | 55 | Promoted to the Premier Division |
| 2 | Hinckley Athletic | 38 | 22 | 9 | 7 | 66 | 38 | 1.737 | 53 | Promoted to the Premier Division |
| 3 | Hastings United | 38 | 22 | 8 | 8 | 86 | 36 | 2.389 | 52 | Promoted to the Premier Division |
| 4 | Nuneaton Borough | 38 | 21 | 10 | 7 | 82 | 41 | 2.000 | 52 | Promoted to the Premier Division |
| 5 | Tonbridge | 38 | 22 | 8 | 8 | 81 | 51 | 1.588 | 52 | |
| 6 | Dover | 38 | 22 | 7 | 9 | 78 | 56 | 1.393 | 51 | |
| 7 | Corby Town | 38 | 19 | 8 | 11 | 79 | 50 | 1.580 | 46 | |
| 8 | King's Lynn | 38 | 19 | 7 | 12 | 76 | 66 | 1.152 | 45 | |
| 9 | Cheltenham Town | 38 | 18 | 7 | 13 | 83 | 52 | 1.596 | 43 | |
| 10 | Folkestone Town | 38 | 15 | 10 | 13 | 79 | 57 | 1.386 | 40 | |
| 11 | Canterbury City | 38 | 14 | 8 | 16 | 42 | 56 | 0.750 | 36 | |
| 12 | Yiewsley | 38 | 11 | 10 | 17 | 63 | 71 | 0.887 | 32 | |
| 13 | Ramsgate Athletic | 38 | 12 | 7 | 19 | 58 | 82 | 0.707 | 31 | |
| 14 | Trowbridge Town | 38 | 11 | 9 | 18 | 50 | 81 | 0.617 | 31 | |
| 15 | Burton Albion | 38 | 10 | 10 | 18 | 48 | 76 | 0.632 | 30 | |
| 16 | Gloucester City | 38 | 9 | 11 | 18 | 42 | 78 | 0.538 | 29 | |
| 17 | Sittingbourne | 38 | 12 | 3 | 23 | 56 | 75 | 0.747 | 27 | |
| 18 | Ashford Town (Kent) | 38 | 9 | 6 | 23 | 48 | 76 | 0.632 | 24 | |
| 19 | Barry Town | 38 | 6 | 5 | 27 | 35 | 75 | 0.467 | 17 | |
| 20 | Tunbridge Wells United | 38 | 6 | 2 | 30 | 43 | 116 | 0.371 | 14 | |

Source: rsssf.com
Rules for classification: 1) points; 2) goal ratio.

== Football League elections ==
Alongside the four League clubs facing re-election, a total of 12 non-League clubs applied for election, including seven Southern League clubs. All four League clubs were re-elected.

| Club | League | Votes |
|---|---|---|
| Bradford City | Football League | 47 |
| Lincoln City | Football League | 47 |
| Chester | Football League | 43 |
| Hartlepools United | Football League | 34 |
| Scarborough | Midland League | 5 |
| Gateshead | Northern League | 4 |
| Guildford City | Southern League | 3 |
| Morecambe | Lancashire Combination | 2 |
| Romford | Southern League | 2 |
| New Brighton | Lancashire Combination | 1 |
| South Shields | North Eastern League | 1 |
| Wellington Town | Southern League | 1 |
| Weymouth | Southern League | 1 |
| Yeovil Town | Southern League | 1 |
| Bexleyheath & Welling | Southern League | 0 |
| Corby Town | Southern League | 0 |
