= 1963–64 Southern Football League =

The 1963–64 Southern Football League season was the 61st in the history of the league, an English football competition.

Yeovil Town won the championship, whilst Cheltenham Town, Folkestone Town, King's Lynn, and Tonbridge were all promoted to the Premier Division. Seven Southern League clubs applied to join the Football League at the end of the season, but none were successful.

== Premier Division ==
The Premier Division consisted of 22 clubs, including 18 clubs from the previous season and four new clubs, promoted from Division One:

- Hastings United
- Hinckley Athletic
- Margate
- Nuneaton Borough

Also, Bexleyheath & Welling changed name to Bexley United.

=== League table ===
Southern Football League Premier Division
- Season: 1963–64
- Champions: Yeovil Town
- Relegated: Hereford United; Hinckley Athletic; Kettering Town; Merthyr Tydfil
- Matches: 462
- Goals: 1,574 (3.41 per match)

Pos	Team	Pld	W	D	L	GF	GA	GR	Pts	Promotion or relegation
1	Yeovil Town	42	29	5	8	93	36	2.583	63	
2	Chelmsford City	42	26	7	9	99	55	1.800	59	
3	Bath City	42	24	9	9	88	51	1.725	57	
4	Guildford City	42	21	9	12	90	55	1.636	51	
5	Romford	42	20	9	13	71	58	1.224	49	
6	Hastings United	42	20	8	14	75	61	1.230	48	
7	Weymouth	42	20	7	15	65	53	1.226	47	
8	Bedford Town	42	19	9	14	71	68	1.044	47	
9	Cambridge United	42	17	9	16	92	77	1.195	43	
10	Cambridge City	42	17	9	16	76	70	1.086	43	
11	Wisbech Town	42	17	8	17	64	68	0.941	42	
12	Bexley United	42	16	10	16	70	77	0.909	42	
13	Dartford	42	16	8	18	56	71	0.789	40	
14	Worcester City	42	12	15	15	70	74	0.946	39	
15	Nuneaton Borough	42	15	8	19	58	61	0.951	38	
16	Rugby Town	42	15	8	19	68	86	0.791	38	
17	Margate	42	12	13	17	68	81	0.840	37	
18	Wellington Town	42	12	9	21	73	85	0.859	33	
19	Merthyr Tydfil	42	12	8	22	69	108	0.639	32	Relegated to Division One
20	Hereford United	42	12	7	23	58	86	0.674	31	Relegated to Division One
21	Kettering Town	42	10	5	27	49	89	0.551	25	Relegated to Division One
22	Hinckley Athletic	42	7	6	29	51	104	0.490	20	Relegated to Division One

Source: fchd.com rsssf.com
Rules for classification: 1) points; 2) goal ratio.

== Division One ==
Division One consisted of 22 clubs, including 16 clubs from the previous season and six new clubs:

- Three clubs relegated from the Premier Division:
  - Clacton Town
  - Gravesend & Northfleet
  - Poole Town
- Plus:
  - Crawley Town, joined from the Metropolitan League
  - Deal Town, joined from the Aetolian League
  - Stevenage Town, joined from the Delphian League

Also, Tunbridge Wells United changed name to Tunbridge Wells Rangers.

At the end of the season, Yiewsley changed name to Hillingdon Borough, while Clacton Town switched to the Eastern Football League.

=== League table ===
Southern Football League Division One
- Season: 1963–64
- Champions: Folkestone Town
- Promoted: Cheltenham Town; Folkestone Town; King's Lynn; Tonbridge
- Matches: 462
- Goals: 1,585 (3.43 per match)

Pos	Team	Pld	W	D	L	GF	GA	GR	Pts	Promotion or relegation
1	Folkestone Town	42	28	7	7	82	38	2.158	63	Promoted to the Premier Division
2	King's Lynn	42	28	5	9	94	44	2.136	61	Promoted to the Premier Division
3	Cheltenham Town	42	25	10	7	92	49	1.878	60	Promoted to the Premier Division
4	Tonbridge	42	24	11	7	98	54	1.815	59	Promoted to the Premier Division
5	Corby Town	42	24	7	11	114	56	2.036	55	
6	Stevenage Town	42	21	6	15	70	59	1.186	48	
7	Ashford Town (Kent)	42	19	9	14	73	57	1.281	47	
8	Burton Albion	42	19	8	15	76	70	1.086	46	
9	Poole Town	42	17	11	14	75	61	1.230	45	
10	Dover	42	18	9	15	86	75	1.147	45	
11	Canterbury City	42	16	12	14	66	66	1.000	44	
12	Crawley Town	42	20	2	20	81	71	1.141	42	
13	Trowbridge Town	42	16	9	17	71	78	0.910	41	
14	Clacton Town	42	19	1	22	76	88	0.864	39	Resigned to the Eastern Football League
15	Gloucester City	42	17	4	21	88	89	0.989	38	
16	Yiewsley	42	15	8	19	63	77	0.818	38	
17	Sittingbourne	42	15	8	19	52	70	0.743	38	
18	Ramsgate Athletic	42	13	9	20	57	55	1.036	35	
19	Tunbridge Wells Rangers	42	10	8	24	47	89	0.528	28	
20	Gravesend & Northfleet	42	7	9	26	43	96	0.448	23	
21	Deal Town	42	5	7	30	48	106	0.453	17	
22	Barry Town	42	3	6	33	33	137	0.241	12	

Source: fchd.com rsssf.com
Rules for classification: 1) points; 2) goal ratio.

== Football League elections ==
Alongside the four League clubs facing re-election, a total of 13 non-League clubs applied for election, including seven Southern League clubs. All four League clubs were re-elected.

Club	League	Votes
York City	Football League	48
Southport	Football League	45
Barrow	Football League	42
Hartlepools United	Football League	36
Wigan Athletic	Cheshire League	5
Gateshead	Northern League	4
Romford	Southern League	4
Yeovil Town	Southern League	3
South Shields	North Eastern League	3
New Brighton	Lancashire Combination	2
Guildford City	Southern League	2
Gloucester City	Southern League	1
Morecambe	Lancashire Combination	1
Weymouth	Southern League	1
Bexley United	Southern League	0
Poole Town	Southern League	0
Scarborough	Midland League	0
