= 1958–59 Southern Football League =

The 1958–59 Southern Football League season was the 56th in the history of the league, an English football competition.

It was the first season since 1936 the league split into two divisions following the election of thirteen new clubs at the end of the previous season. Hereford United won the North-West Division, whilst Bedford Town won the South-East Division. Bedford were declared Southern League champions after defeating Hereford 2–1 in a championship play-off at Edgar Street on 9 May. Nine clubs applied to join the Football League, although none were successful.

The plan for the following season was to have a Premier Division of 22 clubs and a Division One below it. As a result, the top eleven clubs in each division this season would remain in the new Premier Division, whilst clubs finishing twelfth or lower would be in the new Division One.

== North-West Division ==
It was the first and the only North-West Division season. North-West Division consisted of 18 clubs, including 11 Southern League clubs from the previous season and seven new clubs:

- Three clubs from the Birmingham & District League:
  - Burton Albion
  - Nuneaton Borough
  - Rugby Town
- One club from the Cheshire League:
  - Wellington Town
- Three clubs from the Midland League:
  - Boston United
  - Corby Town
  - Wisbech Town

At the end of the season Southern League divisions were restructured. The top eleven clubs in each division this season remained in the new Premier Division, whilst clubs finishing twelfth or lower relegated to the new Division One. Lovells Athletic left the league and switched to the Welsh football pyramid.

=== League table ===
Southern Football League North-West Division
- Season: 1958–59
- Champions: Hereford United
- Relegated: Burton Albion; Corby Town; Gloucester City; Kidderminster Harriers; Merthyr Tydfil; Rugby Town
- Matches: 306
- Goals: 1,173 (3.83 per match)

Pos	Team	Pld	W	D	L	GF	GA	GR	Pts	Promotion or relegation
1	Hereford United	34	22	5	7	80	37	2.162	49	
2	Kettering Town	34	20	7	7	83	63	1.317	47	
3	Boston United	34	18	8	8	73	47	1.553	44	
4	Cheltenham Town	34	20	4	10	65	47	1.383	44	
5	Worcester City	34	19	4	11	74	47	1.574	42	
6	Bath City	34	17	5	12	89	62	1.435	39	
7	Wellington Town	34	15	9	10	74	58	1.276	39	
8	Nuneaton Borough	34	17	5	12	76	66	1.152	39	
9	Wisbech Town	34	16	5	13	77	54	1.426	37	
10	Headington United	34	16	3	15	76	61	1.246	35	
11	Barry Town	34	15	5	14	64	67	0.955	35	
12	Merthyr Tydfil	34	16	3	15	54	59	0.915	35	Relegated to Division One
13	Gloucester City	34	12	6	16	50	65	0.769	30	Relegated to Division One
14	Corby Town	34	10	8	16	59	79	0.747	28	Relegated to Division One
15	Lovells Athletic	34	10	3	21	51	70	0.729	23	Resigned from the league
16	Rugby Town	34	7	6	21	45	93	0.484	20	Relegated to Division One
17	Kidderminster Harriers	34	7	3	24	42	94	0.447	17	Relegated to Division One
18	Burton Albion	34	3	3	28	41	104	0.394	9	Relegated to Division One

Source: rsssf.com
Rules for classification: 1) points; 2) goal ratio.

== South-East Division ==
It was the first and the only South-East Division season. South-East Division consisted of 17 clubs, including 11 Southern League clubs from the previous season and six new clubs:

- Cambridge City, from the Athenian League
- Cambridge United, from the Eastern Counties League
- Clacton Town, from the Eastern Counties League
- King's Lynn, from the Midland League
- Trowbridge Town, from the Western League
- Yiewsley, from the Corinthian League

At the end of the season Southern League divisions were restructured. The top eleven clubs in each division this season remained in the new Premier Division, whilst clubs finishing twelfth or lower relegated to the new Division One.

=== League table ===
Southern Football League South-East Division
- Season: 1958–59
- Champions: Bedford Town
- Relegated: Cambridge United; Clacton Town; Exeter City II; Guildford City; Yiewsley; Trowbridge Town
- Matches: 272
- Goals: 1,023 (3.76 per match)

Pos	Team	Pld	W	D	L	GF	GA	GR	Pts	Promotion or relegation
1	Bedford Town	32	21	6	5	90	41	2.195	48	
2	Gravesend & Northfleet	32	21	2	9	79	54	1.463	44	
3	Dartford	32	20	3	9	77	41	1.878	43	
4	Yeovil Town	32	17	8	7	60	41	1.463	42	
5	Weymouth	32	13	11	8	61	43	1.419	37	
6	Chelmsford City	32	12	12	8	74	53	1.396	36	
7	King's Lynn	32	14	5	13	70	63	1.111	33	
8	Poole Town	32	12	8	12	60	65	0.923	32	
9	Cambridge City	32	12	7	13	61	54	1.130	31	
10	Hastings United	32	13	5	14	60	59	1.017	31	
11	Tonbridge	32	14	3	15	51	59	0.864	31	
12	Cambridge United	32	11	8	13	55	77	0.714	30	Relegated to Division One
13	Trowbridge Town	32	12	4	16	53	75	0.707	28	Relegated to Division One
14	Exeter City II	32	7	12	13	47	71	0.662	26	Relegated to Division One
15	Guildford City	32	7	6	19	45	67	0.672	20	Relegated to Division One
16	Clacton Town	32	6	7	19	44	81	0.543	19	Relegated to Division One
17	Yiewsley	32	3	7	22	36	78	0.462	13	Relegated to Division One

Source: rsssf.com
Rules for classification: 1) points; 2) goal ratio.

== Football League election ==
Nine Southern League clubs applied to join the Football League. However, all four League clubs were re-elected.

Club	League	Votes
Oldham Athletic	Football League	46
Southport	Football League	34
Barrow	Football League	32
Aldershot	Football League	31
Peterborough United	Midland League	26
Headington United	Southern League	7
Worcester City	Southern League	7
Wigan Athletic	Lancashire Combination	3
Cambridge City	Southern League	2
Gloucester City	Southern League	2
Kettering Town	Southern League	1
South Shields	Midland League	1
Scarborough	Midland League	1
Yeovil Town	Southern League	0
Bedford Town	Southern League	0
Hereford United	Southern League	0
King's Lynn	Southern League	0
Morecambe	Lancashire Combination	0
