= Clacton Town F.C. =

Association football club in England

Coordinates: 51°47′35.29″N 1°07′34.79″E

Clacton Town
- Full name: Clacton Town Football Club
- Nickname: The Seasiders
- Founded: 1892 (original club); 1902 (Old Clactonians); 1913 (second reformation)
- Ground: Rush Green Bowl, Clacton
- Capacity: 3,000 (200 seated)
- Chairman: Jon Willis
- Manager: Kieron Shelley
- League: Eastern Counties League Division One North
- 2025–26: Eastern Counties League Division One North, 11th of 20
| Home colours | Away colours |

Clacton Town Football Club is a football club based in Clacton-on-Sea, Essex, England. The club are currently members of the Eastern Counties League Division One North and play at the Rush Green Bowl.

== History ==
The original Clacton Town were established on 27 October 1892 and joined the North Essex League in 1895. They won Division Two in 1898–99 and 1899–1900, as well as the Essex Junior Cup in 1900. They were then promoted to Division One, but folded at the end of the 1900–01 season. A group of former players formed Old Clactonians, who joined the Harwich & District League in 1902. They remained in the league until 1905, when they were renamed Clacton Town and joined the Clacton & District League, winning it in their first season. The club then returned to the Harwich & District League, and also joined the South East Anglian League in 1907, winning Division Two in 1907–08.

In 1908 Clacton also began playing Colchester & District League and were Division Two champions and the Division Two Cup winners in 1909–10, also winning Division Two of the (now renamed) East Anglian League the following season. In 1912 the club folded for a second time, but were re-established the following year. They rejoined the Essex & Suffolk Border League (as the Colchester & District League was now known), remaining in it until 1934. During this period the club also played in the Ipswich & District League from 1921 until 1924, and again in 1927–28. In 1934 they left the Border League to join the Ipswich & District League. In 1935 they were founder members of the Eastern Counties League, finishing as runners up in 1936–37. The following season they switched to the newly established Essex County League, finishing bottom in its only season before returning to the ECL in 1938. In the summer of 1938, it was proposed that Clacton fold, due to a lack of interest in the club in the town. The plans were later shelved, with the club re-joining the Eastern Counties League for the 1938–39 season. In 1948 the club turned professional and in 1952–53 finished as runners-up for a second time.

In 1956–57 Clacton won the East Anglian Cup and reached the fourth and final qualifying round of the FA Cup, but lost 3–2 at home to Yiewsley. After finishing fifth in 1957–58 the club moved up to the South-East Division of the Southern League. Although they finished second from bottom in their first season, the following year they won the newly renamed Division One, and were promoted to the Premier Division. In their first season in the Premier Division they reached the first round of the FA Cup for the first, and to date only time, but lost 3–1 at home to Southend United. However, after finishing twenty-first out of 22 clubs in 1962–63, they were relegated back to Division One, and after a mid-table finish in 1963–64, returned to the Eastern Counties League.

Clacton finished as runners-up in their first season back in the league, a feat repeated in 1974–75, a season in which they again reached the final qualifying round of the FA Cup. They also won the League Cup in 1973–74. The club remained in the Premier Division until the end of the 1991–92 season, in which they finished second from bottom, and were relegated to Division One. They returned to the Premier Division as Division One champions in 1994–95, and won the Eastern Floodlit Cup the following season. They were relegated again in 1997–98, but won the Division One Cup and Division One at the first attempt to make an immediate return. In 1999–2000 they won the East Anglian Cup for a second time, and in 2001–02 won the League Cup.

In 2005–06 Clacton failed to win a league match all season, finishing bottom of the Premier Division with only a single point and a goal difference of –159. Despite the poor performance, they were not relegated as two clubs (AFC Sudbury and Bury Town) were promoted from the league and one club from Division One (Fulbourn Institute) were refused promotion. Although they improved the following season, finishing twenty-first with 38 points, they were relegated to Division One. On 15 June 2007 the club was reconstituted as F.C. Clacton, a community interest company. They returned to the Premier Division after finishing as Division One runners-up in 2009–10. Despite finishing bottom of the Premier Division in 2012–13, the club were not relegated as two clubs left the Premier Division and only two clubs were promoted from Division One.

At the end of the 2020–21 season Clacton were transferred to the Essex Senior League. In 2024–25 they finished bottom of the league and were relegated to Division One South of the Eastern Counties League. In 2026 the club returned to its original name of Clacton Town.

== Grounds ==
Old Clactonians initially played on a pitch behind the Queen's Head pub in Great Clacton, before moving to a ground behind the National Schools in 1903. In 1906 they were invited to share the Old Road Ground by Clacton Cricket Club. The ground had a wooden stand purchased from Barnardo's Homes. The ground was reorganised in 1935 when a car park was built on around a third of its area and a new wooden stand was erected; the original stand was later dismantled as it was now in one corner of the ground. A railway carriage was used for changing rooms, with the home team changing in the first class section and the match officials in third class. A new concrete stand was built after World War II seating over 500, with new terracing installed on the south-east corner of the ground in the 1950s, together with a new covered terrace on the southern side of the pitch. From 1967 until 1987 Old Road also hosted greyhound racing, which involved removing two of the stands to fit in the track.

In 1985 the local council decided to sell the site for a retail park. The club remained at the ground until 1987, with the last match being played against Lowestoft Town on 21 February. The club then played home matches at Gainsford Avenue, the home ground of St Osyth College, with the first match at the new ground on 28 February against March Town United. In November 1987 they moved to their current Rush Green Bowl ground, playing their first match on 7 November against Soham Town Rangers, although the game had to be abandoned due to floodlight failure. The ground had originally been discussed as a potential new home for the club in the 1970s. A small stand was built on one side of the pitch with three rows of bench seating, which was given the name 'the Loft'. A covered stand was later erected on the other side of the pitch; it became known as the 'Bus Shelter', with a bus timetable and bus stop sign added to it. In 2000 another covered stand was built behind one goal.

== Honours ==
- Southern League
  - Division One champions 1959–60
- Eastern Counties League
  - Division One champions 1994–95, 1998–99
  - League Cup winners 1973–74, 2001–02
  - Division One Cup winners 1998–99
- East Anglian Cup
  - Winners 1956–57, 1999–2000
- Eastern Floodlit Cup
  - Winners 1995–96
- Essex Junior Cup
  - Winners 1899–1900
- North Essex League
  - Division Two champions 1898–99, 1899–1900
- South East Anglian League
  - Division Two champions 1907–08
- Colchester & District League League
  - Division Two champions 1909–10
  - Division Two Cup winners 1909–10
- East Anglian League
  - Champions 1910–11
- Clacton & District League
  - Champions 1905–06

== Records ==
- Best FA Cup performance: First round, 1960–61
- Best FA Trophy performance: First qualifying round, 1969–70, 1978–79
- Best FA Vase performance: Fourth round, 1974–75, 2008–09
- Record attendance
  - Old Road: 3,505 vs Romford, FA Cup first qualifying round, 1952–53
  - Rush Green Bowl: 900 for Clacton Veterans vs Arsenal Veterans, 4 August 2002

== See also ==
- F.C. Clacton players
- F.C. Clacton managers
