= 1959–60 Southern Football League =

The 1959–60 Southern Football League season was the 57th in the history of the league, an English football competition.

The league split into a Premier Division and Division One, the first time the league had had two hierarchical divisions since 1919–20. Bath City won the championship, whilst Clacton Town, Romford, Folkestone Town and Guildford City were all promoted to the Premier Division. Eleven Southern League clubs applied to join the Football League at the end of the season, but none were successful.

== Premier Division ==
Premier Division was formed at the end of the previous season, with eleven top clubs from both North-West and South-East divisions joined.

At the end of the season Headington United was renamed Oxford United.

=== League table ===
Southern Football League Premier Division
- Season: 1959–60
- Champions: Bath City
- Relegated: Barry Town; Kettering Town; Nuneaton Borough; Poole Town
- Matches: 462
- Goals: 1,722 (3.73 per match)

Pos	Team	Pld	W	D	L	GF	GA	GR	Pts	Promotion or relegation
1	Bath City	42	32	3	7	116	50	2.320	67	
2	Headington United	42	23	8	11	78	61	1.279	54	
3	Weymouth	42	22	9	11	93	69	1.348	53	
4	Cheltenham Town	42	21	6	15	82	68	1.206	48	
5	Cambridge City	42	18	11	13	81	72	1.125	47	
6	Chelmsford City	42	19	7	16	90	70	1.286	45	
7	Bedford Town	42	21	3	18	97	85	1.141	45	
8	King's Lynn	42	17	11	14	89	78	1.141	45	
9	Boston United	42	17	10	15	83	80	1.038	44	
10	Wisbech Town	42	17	10	15	81	84	0.964	44	
11	Yeovil Town	42	17	8	17	81	73	1.110	42	
12	Hereford United	42	15	12	15	70	74	0.946	42	
13	Tonbridge	42	16	8	18	79	73	1.082	40	
14	Hastings United	42	16	8	18	63	77	0.818	40	
15	Wellington Town	42	13	11	18	63	78	0.808	37	
16	Dartford	42	15	7	20	64	82	0.780	37	
17	Gravesend & Northfleet	42	14	8	20	69	84	0.821	36	
18	Worcester City	42	13	10	19	72	89	0.809	36	
19	Nuneaton Borough	42	11	11	20	64	78	0.821	33	Relegated to Division One
20	Barry Town	42	14	5	23	78	103	0.757	33	Relegated to Division One
21	Poole Town	42	10	8	24	69	96	0.719	28	Relegated to Division One
22	Kettering Town	42	9	10	23	60	90	0.667	28	Relegated to Division One

Source: rsssf.com
Rules for classification: 1) points; 2) goal ratio.

== Division One ==
Division One was formed at the end of the previous season with clubs finished below eleventh place in North-West and South East divisions joined. Also, Division One featured ten new clubs:

- Eight clubs from the disbanded Kent League:
  - Ashford Town (Kent)
  - Bexleyheath & Welling
  - Dover
  - Folkestone Town
  - Margate
  - Ramsgate Athletic
  - Sittingbourne
  - Tunbridge Wells United
- Plus:
  - Hinckley Athletic, from the Birmingham & District League
  - Romford, from the Isthmian League

=== League table ===
Southern Football League Division One
- Season: 1959–60
- Champions: Clacton Town
- Promoted: Clacton Town; Romford; Folkestone Town; Guildford City
- Matches: 462
- Goals: 1,625 (3.52 per match)

Pos	Team	Pld	W	D	L	GF	GA	GR	Pts	Promotion or relegation
1	Clacton Town	42	27	5	10	106	69	1.536	59	Promoted to the Premier Division
2	Romford	42	21	11	10	65	40	1.625	53	Promoted to the Premier Division
3	Folkestone Town	42	23	5	14	93	71	1.310	51	Promoted to the Premier Division
4	Exeter City II	42	23	3	16	85	62	1.371	49	Left the league
5	Guildford City	42	19	9	14	79	56	1.411	47	Promoted to the Premier Division
6	Sittingbourne	42	20	7	15	66	56	1.179	47	
7	Margate	42	20	6	16	88	77	1.143	46	
8	Trowbridge Town	42	18	9	15	89	78	1.141	45	
9	Cambridge United	42	18	9	15	71	72	0.986	45	
10	Yiewsley	42	16	11	15	83	71	1.169	43	
11	Bexleyheath & Welling	42	16	11	15	85	77	1.104	43	
12	Merthyr Tydfil	42	16	10	16	63	65	0.969	42	
13	Ramsgate Athletic	42	16	8	18	84	85	0.988	40	
14	Ashford Town (Kent)	42	14	12	16	61	70	0.871	40	
15	Tunbridge Wells United	42	17	5	20	77	74	1.041	39	
16	Hinckley Athletic	42	14	8	20	62	75	0.827	36	
17	Gloucester City	42	13	9	20	56	84	0.667	35	
18	Dover	42	14	6	22	59	85	0.694	34	
19	Kidderminster Harriers	42	14	6	22	59	97	0.608	34	Switched to the Birmingham & District League
20	Corby Town	42	15	3	24	75	91	0.824	33	
21	Burton Albion	42	11	10	21	52	79	0.658	32	
22	Rugby Town	42	10	11	21	67	91	0.736	31	

Source: rsssf.com
Rules for classification: 1) points; 2) goal ratio.

== Football League elections ==
Eleven Southern League clubs (including Guildford City and Romford from Division One) applied for election to the Football League. Although none were successful, Peterborough United were elected at the expense of Gateshead.

Club	League	Votes
Oldham Athletic	Football League	39
Peterborough United	Midland League	35
Hartlepools United	Football League	34
Southport	Football League	29
Gateshead	Football League	18
Headington United	Southern League	10
Chelmsford City	Southern League	3
Bedford Town	Southern League	2
Cambridge City	Southern League	2
Guildford City	Southern League	2
New Brighton	Lancashire Combination	2
Romford	Southern League	2
Scarborough	Midland League	2
Worcester City	Southern League	2
Ellesmere Port Town	Cheshire League	1
Kettering Town	Southern League	1
Morecambe	Lancashire Combination	1
South Shields	Midland League	1
Hereford United	Southern League	0
King's Lynn	Southern League	0
Yeovil Town	Southern League	0
