= 1978–79 FA Trophy =

Tenth season of the FA Trophy

1978-79 FA Trophy
FA Challenge Trophy

Tournament details
- Country: England; Wales
- Teams: 227

Final positions
- Champions: Stafford Rangers
- Runners-up: Kettering Town

The 1978–79 FA Trophy was the tenth season of the FA Trophy, and this was to be the last season in which the Northern Premier League, Southern League and Isthmian League would be Level 5 in the English Pyramid System.

== Preliminary round ==
=== Ties ===
Tie	Home team	Score	Away team
1	Alfreton Town	1-3	Bridlington Trinity
2	Arnold	1-1	Stourbridge
3	Ashford Town (Kent)	3-1	Bromley
4	Basingstoke Town	2-1	Welton Rovers
5	Bilston	2-1	Moor Green
6	Bootle	4-1	Connah's Quay Nomads
7	Boston	2-0	Spalding United
8	Bridport	2-3	Tiverton Town
9	Cinderford Town	0-1	Barry Town
10	Clacton Town	3-0	Gorleston
11	Clapton	4-0	Aveley
12	Colwyn Bay	1-0	Oswestry Town
13	Corby Town	1-0	St Albans City
14	Darlaston	1-0	Tamworth
15	Dawlish Town	1-1	Bridgwater Town
16	Dunstable	3-1	Wokingham Town
17	Eastwood Hanley	1-1	Bedworth United
18	Eastwood Town	6-1	Belper Town
19	Epsom & Ewell	1-1	Hounslow
20	Fareham Town	3-0	Andover
21	Finchley	0-1	Crawley Town
22	Folkestone & Shepway	3-1	Sheppey United
23	Glastonbury	1-3	Clevedon Town
24	Harwich & Parkeston	4-0	Sudbury Town
25	Heanor Town	1-3	Alvechurch
26	Hertford Town	6-1	Chesham United
27	Hornchurch	2-0	Hampton
28	Ilford	2-1	Addlestone
29	Kirkby Town	1-0	Skelmersdale United
30	Maidenhead United	3-2	Aylesbury United
31	Mangotsfield United	2-1	Shepton Mallet Town
32	Medway	0-0	Ramsgate
33	Paulton Rovers	1-2	Salisbury
34	Tonbridge	2-0	Sittingbourne
35	Trowbridge Town	2-2	Gloucester City
36	Walton & Hersham	1-1	Corinthian-Casuals
37	Wembley	2-1	Metropolitan Police

=== Replays ===
Tie	Home team	Score	Away team
2	Stourbridge	0-1	Arnold
15	Bridgwater Town	2-1	Dawlish Town
17	Bedworth United	1-0	Eastwood Hanley
19	Hounslow	0-1	Epsom & Ewell
32	Ramsgate	0-1	Medway
35	Gloucester City	1-2	Trowbridge Town
36	Corinthian-Casuals	0-0	Walton & Hersham

=== 2nd replay ===
Tie	Home team	Score	Away team
36	Walton & Hersham	1-2	Corinthian-Casuals

== First qualifying round ==
=== Ties ===
Tie	Home team	Score	Away team
1	Alvechurch	2-2	Witney Town
2	Arnold	4-2	Wellingborough Town
3	Barking	7-0	Clacton Town
4	Barrow	2-1	Billingham Synthonia
5	Bideford	1-1	Dorchester Town
6	Bognor Regis Town	3-1	Ashford Town (Kent)
7	Bootle	3-1	Pwllheli & District
8	Boston	2-0	Ashton United
9	Bridgend Town	0-2	Llanelli
10	Bridgwater Town	3-1	Poole Town
11	Burscough	1-0	Rhyl
12	Cambridge City	2-2	Wealdstone
13	Clapton	2-2	King's Lynn
14	Clevedon Town	0-3	Weston super Mare
15	Colwyn Bay	0-2	Formby
16	Corby Town	0-2	Lye Town
17	Corinthian-Casuals	3-3	Basingstoke Town
18	Croydon	5-0	Epsom & Ewell
19	Darlaston	0-1	A P Leamington
20	Dudley Town	2-2	Bedworth United
21	Dulwich Hamlet	1-0	Carshalton Athletic
22	Dunstable	1-2	Hayes
23	Emley	1-1	Penrith
24	Enderby Town	2-1	Sutton Coldfield town
25	Evenwood Town	0-2	Accrington Stanley
26	Folkestone & Shepway	3-1	Crawley Town
27	Frome Town	1-2	Taunton Town
28	Harlow Town	1-1	Harwich & Parkeston
29	Harrow Borough	5-3	Ware
30	Hertford Town	0-1	Tilbury
31	Highgate United	1-1	Bilston
32	Horden Colliery Welfare	2-0	Durham City
33	Ilford	1-0	Hornchurch
34	Kirkby Town	2-1	St Helens Town
35	Leek Town	1-2	Mossley
36	Leytonstone	1-1	Boreham Wood
37	Long Eaton United	2-0	Worksop Town
38	Louth United	2-2	Eastwood Town
39	Maidenhead United	1-1	Kingstonian
40	Mangotsfield United	0-2	Redditch United
41	Medway	2-0	Horsham
42	Mexborough Town	1-2	Droylsden
43	Milton Keynes City	1-0	Lowestoft Town
44	Nantwich Town	0-2	Stalybridge Celtic
45	New Brighton	0-0	South Liverpool
46	New Mills{1}	1-2	Buxton
47	North Shields	0-0	Netherfield
48	Prestwich Heys	2-5	Gateshead
49	Radcliffe Borough	2-1	Ferryhill Athletic
50	Salisbury	1-1	Tiverton Town
51	Shildon	0-0	Bridlington Trinity
52	South Bank	0-4	Darwen
53	Sutton Town	2-0	Hyde United
54	Ton Pentre	0-3	Oxford City
55	Tonbridge	2-1	Fareham Town
56	Tow Law Town	1-0	West Auckland Town
57	Trowbridge Town	1-1	Barry Town
58	Wembley	1-1	Barnet
59	Whitley Bay	1-4	Horwich R M I
60	Wisbech Town	1-1	Chelmsford City
61	Witton Albion	2-1	Middlewich Athletic
62	Woking	2-2	Waterlooville

=== Replays ===
Tie	Home team	Score	Away team
1	Witney Town	2-1	Alvechurch
5	Dorchester Town	2-1	Bideford
12	Wealdstone	0-0	Cambridge City
13	King's Lynn	3-1	Clapton
17	Basingstoke Town	1-2	Corinthian-Casuals
20	Bedworth United	2-1	Dudley Town
23	Penrith	1-4	Emley
28	Harwich & Parkeston	0-1	Harlow Town
31	Bilston	3-2	Highgate United
36	Boreham Wood	2-2	Leytonstone
38	Eastwood Town	4-3	Louth United
39	Kingstonian	0-1	Maidenhead United
45	South Liverpool	3-2	New Brighton
47	Netherfield	1-3	North Shields
50	Tiverton Town	0-4	Salisbury
51	Bridlington Trinity	2-1	Shildon
57	Barry Town	4-1	Trowbridge Town
58	Barnet	2-3	Wembley
60	Chelmsford City	2-2	Wisbech Town
62	Waterlooville	3-3	Woking

=== 2nd replays ===
Tie	Home team	Score	Away team
12	Wealdstone	2-1	Cambridge City
36	Leytonstone	0-4	Boreham Wood
60	Wisbech Town	2-3	Chelmsford City
62	Waterlooville	0-0	Woking

=== 3rd replay ===
Tie	Home team	Score	Away team
62	Woking	1-0	Waterlooville

== Second qualifying round ==
=== Ties ===
Tie	Home team	Score	Away team
1	Arnold	0-3	Eastwood Town
2	Barking	10-2	Chelmsford City
3	Barry Town	2-1	Weston super Mare
4	Bilston	1-5	Sutton Town
5	Bognor Regis Town	1-1	Woking
6	Bootle	0-3	Witton Albion
7	Boreham Wood	3-3	Tilbury
8	Boston	3-0	Bedworth United
9	Bridgwater Town	1-1	Salisbury
10	Bridlington Trinity	1-1	North Shields
11	Burscough	2-3	Barrow
12	Buxton	1-1	South Liverpool
13	Corinthian-Casuals	0-4	Wembley
14	Croydon	3-1	Folkestone & Shepway
15	Darwen	1-1	Tow Law Town
16	Droylsden	0-1	Accrington Stanley
17	Emley	1-1	Gateshead
18	Enderby Town	1-1	Long Eaton United
19	Harrow Borough	2-1	A P Leamington
20	Hayes	2-1	Milton Keynes City
21	Horden Colliery Welfare	0-0	Radcliffe Borough
22	Horwich R M I	3-0	Ashington
23	King's Lynn	2-1	Ilford
24	Llanelli	1-4	Redditch United
25	Lye Town	1-1	Witney Town
26	Medway	0-1	Maidenhead United
27	Mossley	2-2	Formby
28	Southall & Ealing Borough	0-1	Oxford City
29	Stalybridge Celtic	4-0	Kirkby Town
30	Taunton Town	3-2	Dorchester Town
31	Tonbridge	2-3	Dulwich Hamlet
32	Wealdstone	1-2	Harlow Town

=== Replays ===
Tie	Home team	Score	Away team
5	Woking	2-0	Bognor Regis Town
7	Tilbury	2-1	Boreham Wood
9	Salisbury	2-1	Bridgwater Town
10	North Shields	0-2	Bridlington Trinity
12	South Liverpool	0-2	Buxton
15	Tow Law Town	7-2	Darwen
17	Gateshead	2-1	Emley
18	Long Eaton United	4-2	Enderby Town
21	Radcliffe Borough	1-2	Horden Colliery Welfare
25	Witney Town	1-0	Lye Town
27	Formby	2-3	Mossley

== Third qualifying round ==
=== Ties ===
Tie	Home team	Score	Away team
1	Accrington Stanley	6-1	Gateshead
2	Bishop Auckland	4-0	Willington
3	Bridlington Trinity	1-3	Chorley
4	Bromsgrove Rovers	0-2	Witney Town
5	Burton Albion	1-1	Grantham
6	Buxton	1-1	Gainsborough Trinity
7	Cheltenham Town	4-2	Banbury United
8	Dulwich Hamlet	1-2	Barking
9	Eastwood Town	1-0	Telford United
10	Enderby Town	1-1	Boston
11	Frickley Athletic	1-2	Barrow
12	Harlow Town	1-1	Croydon
13	Harrow Borough	2-0	Gravesend & Northfleet
14	Hayes	1-0	Hitchin Town
15	Hednesford Town	0-2	Northwich Victoria
16	Hillingdon Borough	2-0	Bishop's Stortford
17	Horden Colliery Welfare	0-1	Consett
18	King's Lynn	2-1	Sutton Town
19	Macclesfield Town	0-0	Witton Albion
20	Maidenhead United	1-2	Minehead
21	Margate	4-1	Dartford
22	Oxford CIty	1-4	Kidderminster Harriers
23	Redditch United	3-0	Barry Town
24	Salisbury	0-2	Taunton Town
25	Staines Town	1-2	Hastings United
26	Stalybridge Celtic	1-1	Mossley
27	Sutton United	4-0	Walthamstow Avenue
28	Tow Law Town	1-1	Horwich R M I
29	Wembley	0-3	Dover
30	Woking	0-0	Tilbury
31	Workington	2-2	Goole Town
32	Yeovil Town	8-1	Merthyr Tydfil

=== Replays ===
Tie	Home team	Score	Away team
5	Grantham	1-0	Burton Albion
6	Gainsborough Trinity	3-2	Buxton
10	Boston	1-1	Enderby Town
12	Croydon	0-1	Harlow Town
19	Witton Albion	3-1	Macclesfield Town
26	Mossley	2-3	Stalybridge Celtic
28	Horwich R M I	6-0	Tow Law Town
30	Tilbury	0-1	Woking
31	Goole Town	3-0	Workington

=== 2nd replay ===
Tie	Home team	Score	Away team
10	Enderby Town	3-0	Boston

== 1st round ==
The teams that given byes to this round are Altrincham, Southport, Scarborough, Matlock Town, Morecambe, Stafford Rangers, Weymouth, Bedford Town, Kettering Town, Boston United, Atherstone Town, Runcorn, Lancaster City, Enfield, Wycombe Wanderers, Dagenham, Tooting & Mitcham United, Leatherhead, Spennymoor United, Falmouth Town, Nuneaton Borough, Bangor City, Hendon, Slough Town, Winsford United, Crook Town, Bath City, Maidstone United, Worcester City, Marine, Blyth Spartans and Whitby Town.

=== Ties ===
Tie	Home team	Score	Away team
1	Altrincham	1-2	Cheltenham Town
2	Atherstone Town	1-2	Boston United
3	Barrow	2-1	Southport
4	Bishop Auckland	0-0	Crook Town
5	Consett	3-2	Accrington Stanley
6	Dagenham	1-1	Tooting & Mitcham United
7	Dover	0-0	Bedford Town
8	Eastwood Town	0-5	Worcester City
9	Enderby Town	3-0	Winsford United
10	Gainsborough Trinity	1-2	Northwich Victoria
11	Goole Town	0-0	Blyth Spartans
12	Grantham	2-3	Runcorn
13	Hayes	2-0	Harrow Borough
14	Hendon	1-2	Witney Town
15	Kettering Town	1-1	Nuneaton Borough
16	Kidderminster Harriers	2-2	Witton Albion
17	King's Lynn	1-0	Redditch United
18	Leatherhead	2-1	Hillingdon Borough
19	Maidstone United	3-0	Harlow Town
20	Margate	2-1	Hastings United
21	Marine	3-1	Bangor City
22	Minehead	2-1	Bath City
23	Morecambe	0-1	Scarborough
24	Slough Town	3-0	Woking
25	Spennymoor United	2-1	Horwich R M I
26	Stafford Rangers	1-1	Matlock Town
27	Stalybridge Celtic	2-2	Chorley
28	Sutton United	0-1	Enfield
29	Weymouth	5-1	Taunton Town
30	Whitby Town	1-3	Lancaster City
31	Wycombe Wanderers	1-0	Barking
32	Yeovil Town	3-0	Falmouth Town

=== Replays ===
Tie	Home team	Score	Away team
4	Crook Town	1-1	Bishop Auckland
6	Tooting & Mitcham United	0-0	Dagenham
7	Bedford Town	3-2	Dover
11	Blyth Spartans	2-1	Goole Town
15	Nuneaton Borough	0-1	Kettering Town
16	Witton Albion	4-2	Kidderminster Harriers
26	Matlock Town	1-2	Stafford Rangers
27	Chorley	2-1	Stalybridge Celtic

=== 2nd replays ===
Tie	Home team	Score	Away team
4	Bishop Auckland	2-0	Crook Town
6	Dagenham	3-1	Tooting & Mitcham United

== 2nd round ==
=== Ties ===
Tie	Home team	Score	Away team
1	Bedford Town	1-3	Runcorn
2	Bishop Auckland	4-2	King's Lynn
3	Blyth Spartans	1-1	Wycombe Wanderers
4	Boston United	4-0	Worcester City
5	Chorley	2-2	Cheltenham Town
6	Enderby Town	1-0	Minehead
7	Hayes	2-1	Consett
8	Kettering Town	3-0	Scarborough
9	Lancaster City	0-0	Leatherhead
10	Maidstone United	3-1	Slough Town
11	Margate	3-0	Marine
12	Northwich Victoria	1-3	Enfield
13	Weymouth	0-1	Stafford Rangers
14	Witney Town	0-2	Dagenham
15	Witton Albion	1-0	Spennymoor United
16	Yeovil Town	5-0	Barrow

=== Replays ===
Tie	Home team	Score	Away team
3	Wycombe Wanderers	3-0	Blyth Spartans
5	Cheltenham Town	2-1	Chorley
9	Leatherhead	4-1	Lancaster City

== 3rd round ==
=== Ties ===
Tie	Home team	Score	Away team
1	Cheltenham Town	0-4	Enfield
2	Enderby Town	2-2	Bishop Auckland
3	Hayes	2-2	Wycombe Wanderers
4	Kettering Town	2-0	Maidstone United
5	Leatherhead	0-1	Yeovil Town
6	Runcorn	0-0	Margate
7	Stafford Rangers	2-1	Boston United
8	Witton Albion	1-1	Dagenham

=== Replays ===
Tie	Home team	Score	Away team
2	Bishop Auckland	4-2	Enderby Town
3	Wycombe Wanderers	2-3	Hayes
6	Margate	0-2	Runcorn
8	Dagenham	1-1	Witton Albion

=== 2nd replay ===
Tie	Home team	Score	Away team
8	Witton Albion	1-3	Dagenham

== 4th round ==
=== Ties ===
Tie	Home team	Score	Away team
1	Bishop Auckland	1-1	Stafford Rangers
2	Dagenham	2-0	Yeovil Town
3	Kettering Town	1-1	Enfield
4	Runcorn	2-1	Hayes

=== Replays ===
Tie	Home team	Score	Away team
1	Stafford Rangers	3-1	Bishop Auckland
3	Enfield	0-3	Kettering Town

== Semi finals ==
=== First leg ===
Tie	Home team	Score	Away team
1	Dagenham	0-0	Kettering Town
2	Runcorn	1-2	Stafford Rangers

=== Second leg ===
Tie	Home team	Score	Away team	Aggregate
1	Kettering Town	1-0	Dagenham	1-0
2	Stafford Rangers	1-1	Runcorn	3-2

== Final ==
Home team	Score	Away team
Stafford Rangers	2-0	Kettering Town
