= 1971–72 FA Trophy =

FA Challenge Trophy

Tournament details
- Country: England; Wales
- Teams: 189

Final positions
- Champions: Stafford Rangers
- Runners-up: Barnet

The 1971–72 FA Trophy was the third season of the FA Trophy.

== First qualifying round ==
=== Ties ===
Tie	Home team	Score	Away team
1	Abergavenny Thursdays	0–0	Lockheed Leamington
2	Alfreton Town	0–4	Retford Town
3	Andover	0–0	Salisbury
4	Arnold	2–0	Long Eaton United
5	Ashby Institute	0–2	Louth United
6	Ashford Town (Kent)	3–2	Ramsgate Athletic
7	Ashton United	3–0	Runcorn
8	Atherstone Town	3–1	Gresley Rovers
9	Bacup Borough	1–5	Morecambe
10	Barry Town	0–0	Cinderford Town
11	Barton Town	3–2	Frickley Colliery
12	Belper Town	2–0	Glossop
13	Bethesda Athletic	2–0	Portmadoc
14	Bexley United	2–1	Basingstoke Town
15	Blaenau Ffestiniog	3–3	Ellesmere Port Town
16	Bletchley	2–1	Biggleswade Town
17	Bodmin Town	0–3	Barnstaple Town
18	Boldon Colliery Welfare	4–0	Horden Colliery Welfare
19	Boston	1–3	Spalding United
20	Bourne Town	2–1	Rushden Town
21	Brett Sports	5–0	Deal Town
22	Brierley Hill Alliance	3–6	Lye Town
23	Cambridge City	2–1	Soham Town Rangers
24	Chippenham Town	4–5	Dorchester Town
25	Connah's Quay Nomads w/o-scr Prestatyn Town		
26	Crawley Town	3–1	Chatham Town
27	Darlaston	3–0	Halesowen Town
28	Droylsden	4–1	Hyde United
29	Ely City	0–7	Lowestoft Town
30	Fleetwood Town	2–1	St Helens Town
31	Hatfield Town	0–2	Dunstable
32	Leyland Motors	2–3	Darwen
33	Loughborough United	1–2	Bedworth United
34	Merthyr Tydfil	1–0	Bridgend Town
35	Netherfield	1–0	Formby
36	New Brighton	4–0	Clitheroe
37	Newhall United	2–2	Heanor Town
38	Redditch United	1–1	Dudley Town
39	Rhyl	3–2	Oswestry Town
40	Rossendale United	2–0	Horwich R M I
41	Sandbach Ramblers	3–0	Radcliffe Borough
42	Selby Town	0–4	Brigg Town
43	Sheppey United	1–2	Canterbury City
44	St Blazey	2–3	Bridport
45	Stamford	1–0	Desborough Town
46	Stevenage Athletic	3–0	St Neots Town
47	Stockton	4–1	Gateshead
48	Sutton Town	3–1	Dinnington Athletic
49	Thetford Town	2–3	Holbeach United
50	Ton Pentre	2–0	Gloucester City
51	Tonbridge	1–1	Sittingbourne
52	Trowbridge Town	8–2	Cowes
53	Warley	2–3	Lower Gornal Athletic
54	Wellingborough Town	6–1	Skegness Town
55	Welton Rovers	2–0	Frome Town
56	Weston super Mare	0–1	Wadebridge Town
57	Whitstable Town	0–4	Folkestone
58	Winterton Rangers	3–2	Hull Brunswick
59	Wisbech Town	5–1	March Town United
60	Witton Albion	2–1	Nantwich Town
61	Worksop Town	4–0	Mexborough Town

=== Replays ===
Tie	Home team	Score	Away team
1	Lockheed Leamington	6–1	Abergavenny Thursdays
3	Salisbury	4–3	Andover
10	Cinderford Town	3–0	Barry Town
15	Ellesmere Port Town	1–2	Blaneau Ffestiniog
37	Heanor Town	2–2	Newhall United
38	Dudley Town	1–2	Redditch United
51	Sittingbourne	1–3	Tonbridge

=== 2nd replay ===
Tie	Home team	Score	Away team
37	Newhall United	2–3	Heanor Town

== Second qualifying round ==
=== Ties ===
Tie	Home team	Score	Away team
1	Arnold	2–1	Heanor Town
2	Atherstone Town	2–1	Bedworth United
3	Barnstaple Town	3–2	Taunton Town
4	Barton Town	7–0	Brigg Town
5	Belper Town	1–4	Worksop Town
6	Bethesda Athletic	0–3	Rhyl
7	Bexley United	2–1	Crawley Town
8	Blaenau Ffestiniog	3–3	Connah's Quay Nomads
9	Bletchley	2–3	Potton United
10	Boldon Colliery Welfare	0–1	Morecambe
11	Bourne Town	2–1	Stamford
12	Brett Sports	1–3	Folkestone
13	Bridport	0–0	Wadebridge Town
14	Cinderford Town	1–3	Merthyr Tydfil
15	Darlaston	1–3	Lower Gornal Athletic
16	Dorchester Town	4–1	Trowbridge Town
17	Droylsden	0–3	Witton Albion
18	Dunstable	4–2	Stevenage Athletic
19	Fleetwood	4–0	Darwen
20	Guildford City	1–0	Ashford Town
21	Holbeach United	2–7	Cambridge City
22	Lockheed Leamington	1–0	Ton Pentre
23	Louth United	1–0	Winterton Rangers
24	Lowestoft Town	1–0	Wisbech Town
25	Redditch United	5–0	Lye Town
26	Rossendale United	3–2	Netherfield
27	Salisbury	3–1	Welton Rovers
28	Sandbach Ramblers	1–1	Ashton United
29	Spalding United	2–2	Wellingborough Town
30	Stockton	2–1	New Brighton
31	Sutton Town	0–3	Retford Town
32	Tonbridge	3–0	Canterbury City

=== Replays ===
Tie	Home team	Score	Away team
8	Connah's Quay Nomads	1–0	Blaenau Ffestiniog
13	Wadebridge Town	2–3	Bridport
28	Ashton United	1–2	Sandbach Ramblers
29	Wellingborough Town	2–0	Spalding United

== Third qualifying round ==
=== Ties ===
Tie	Home team	Score	Away team
1	Arnold	1–1	Barton Town
2	Atherstone Town	4–1	Dunstable
3	Banbury United	4–2	Bridport
4	Barnstaple Town	3–2	Bath City
5	Bexley United	4–0	Potton United
6	Bideford	4–0	Poole Town
7	Bilston	3–0	Sandbach Ramblers
8	Bridlington Town	0–0	Ilkeston Town
9	Bury Town	1–4	Lowestoft Town
10	Cambridge City	3–2	Lockheed Leamington
11	Cheltenham Town	2–2	Merthyr Tydfil
12	Chorley	1–0	Lancaster City
13	Connah's Quay Nomads	3–2	Stalybridge Celtic
14	Corby Town	0–2	Nuneaton Borough
15	Denaby United	1–0	Louth United
16	Dorchester Town	1–1	Salisbury
17	Fleetwood Town	1–1	Kirkby Town
18	Folkestone	2–2	Margate
19	Gainsborough Trinity	3–1	Goole Town
20	Glastonbury	0–2	Minehead
21	Gravesend & Northfleet	0–2	Dartford
22	Hednesford Town	0–1	Great Harwood
23	Lower Gornal Athletic	1–2	Morecambe
24	Rhyl	0–1	Stafford Rangers
25	Rossendale United	1–0	Winsford United
26	South Liverpool	2–1	Redditch United
27	Stockton	2–1	Retford Town
28	Thornycroft Athletic	1–2	King's Lynn
29	Tonbridge	2–0	Guildford City
30	Wellingborough Town	3–1	Bourne Town
31	Witton Albion	1–0	Altrincham
32	Worksop Town	0–0	Boston United

=== Replays ===
Tie	Home team	Score	Away team
1	Barton Town	0–2	Arnold
2	Dunstable	0–0	Atherstone Town
8	Ilkeston Town	3–0	Bridlington Trinity
11	Merthyr Tydfil	2–1	Cheltenham Town
16	Salisbury	0–2	Dorchester Town
17	Kirkby Town	2–0	Fleetwood Town
18	Margate	1–1	Folkestone
32	Boston United	2–4	Worksop Town

=== 2nd replays ===
Tie	Home team	Score	Away team
2	Atherstone Town	5–1	Dunstable
18	Folkestone	1–2	Margate

== 1st round ==
The teams that given byes to this round are Telford United, Macclesfield Town, Bradford Park Avenue, Hillingdon Borough, Wimbledon, Worcester City, Romford, Weymouth, Yeovil Town, Wigan Athletic, South Shields, Bangor City, Mossley, Kidderminster Harriers, Bromsgrove Rovers, Bridgwater Town, Burscough, Chelmsford City, Barnet, Hereford United, Kettering Town, Grantham, Buxton, Burton Albion, Bedford Town, Dover, Scarborough, Northwich Victoria, Matlock Town, Tamworth, Hastings United and Stourbridge.

=== Ties ===
Tie	Home team	Score	Away team
1	Barnstaple Town	2–1	King's Lynn
2	Bedford Town	2–2	Cambridge City
3	Bexley United	3–1	Weymouth
4	Bideford	1–1	Atherstone Town
5	Bradford Park Avenue	1–1	Stafford Rangers
6	Bromsgrove Rovers	3–3	Minehead
7	Burton Albion	2–0	Rossendale United
8	Buxton	1–0	Northwich Victoria
9	Chelmsford City	4–1	Kettering Town
10	Connah's Quay Nomads	2–0	Stockton
11	Dorchester Town	2–0	Tonbridge
12	Dover	0–6	Barnet
13	Grantham	2–2	Bangor City
14	Great Harwood	1–0	Worksop Town
15	Hastings United	3–2	Worcester City
16	Hereford United	3–1	Banbury United
17	Hillingdon Borough	3–2	Margate
18	Ilkeston Town	1–0	Gainsborough Trinity
19	Kidderminster Harriers	1–1	Romford
20	Kirkby Town	2–3	Denaby United
21	Macclesfield Town	2–1	Bilston
22	Matlock Town	1–1	Chorley
23	Merthyr Tydfil	1–0	Bridgwater Town
24	Mossley	0–2	Arnold
25	Nuneaton Borough	1–2	Telford United
26	Scarborough	1–0	South Shields
27	South Liverpool	2–2	Burscough
28	Stourbridge	0–0	Lowestoft Town
29	Tamworth	1–4	Morecambe
30	Wellingborough Town	1–1	Dartford
31	Wigan Athletic	1–0	Witton Albion
32	Wimbledon	1–5	Yeovil Town

=== Replays ===
Tie	Home team	Score	Away team
2	Cambridge City	0–2	Bedford Town
4	Atherstone Town	5–0	Bideford
5	Stafford Rangers	1–0	Bradford Park Avenue
6	Minehead	0–1	Bromsgrove Rovers
13	Bangor City	2–4	Grantham
19	Romford	1–2	Kidderminster Harriers
22	Chorley	2–1	Matlock Town
27	Burscough	1–1	South Liverpool
28	Lowestoft Town	2–0	Stourbridge
30	Dartford	0–0	Wellingborough Town

=== 2nd replays ===
Tie	Home team	Score	Away team
27	South Liverpool	2–1	Burscough
30	Wellingborough Town	0–3	Dartford

== 2nd round ==
=== Ties ===
Tie	Home team	Score	Away team
1	Arnold	1–1	Buxton
2	Bexley United	2–0	Barnstaple Town
3	Chelmsford City	5–1	Merthyr Tydfil
4	Chorley	1–0	Scarborough
5	Connah's Quay Nomads	1–2	Grantham
6	Dartford	0–0	Atherstone Town
7	Dorchester Town	1–0	Bedford Town
8	Great Harwood	3–4	Wigan Athletic
9	Hereford United	2–1	Bromsgrove Rovers
10	Hillingdon Borough	1–0	Kidderminster Harriers
11	Lowestoft Town	0–0	Barnet
12	Macclesfield Town	3–0	Burton Albion
13	Morecambe	4–0	Denaby United
14	South Liverpool	2–3	Telford United
15	Stafford Rangers	3–0	Ilkeston Town
16	Yeovil Town	4–1	Hastings United

=== Replays ===
Tie	Home team	Score	Away team
1	Buxton	2–0	Arnold
6	Atherstone Town	0–1	Dartford
11	Barnet	5–1	Lowestoft Town

== 3rd round ==
=== Ties ===
Tie	Home team	Score	Away team
1	Buxton	3–2	Bexley United
2	Chelmsford City	2–3	Yeovil Town
3	Chorley	0–1	Grantham
4	Dorchester Town	1–1	Telford United
5	Hereford United	0–1	Dartford
6	Hillingdon Borough	1–2	Stafford Rangers
7	Macclesfield Town	2–1	Morecambe
8	Wigan Athletic	1–2	Barnet

=== Replay ===
Tie	Home team	Score	Away team
4	Telford United	3–1	Dorchester Town

== 4th round ==
=== Ties ===
Tie	Home team	Score	Away team
1	Buxton	2–2	Telford United
2	Dartford	0–2	Barnet
3	Grantham	0–1	Yeovil Town
4	Stafford Rangers	1–1	Macclesfield Town

=== Replays ===
Tie	Home team	Score	Away team
1	Telford United	2–1	Buxton
4	Macclesfield Town	0–3	Stafford Rangers

== Semi finals ==
=== Ties ===
Tie	Home team	Score	Away team
1	Barnet	1–0	Telford United
2	Stafford Rangers	4–0	Yeovil Town

== Final ==
15 April 1972
15:00 BST

Stafford Rangers	3-0	Barnet
Williams 66'; Cullerton 72'; Williams 74'

Wembley Stadium, London
Attendance: 24,000
