= 1970–71 FA Trophy =

FA Challenge Trophy

Tournament details
- Country: England; Wales
- Teams: 185

Final positions
- Champions: Telford United
- Runners-up: Hillingdon Borough

The 1970–71 FA Trophy was the second season of the FA Trophy. The competition was set up for non-league clubs which paid their players and were therefore not eligible to enter the FA Amateur Cup.

== First qualifying round ==
=== Ties ===
Tie	Home team	Score	Away team
1	Ashby Institute	2–1	Barton Town
2	Ashford Town (Kent)	2–1	Folkestone
3	Ashton United	2–2	Clitheroe
4	Atherstone Town	2–4	Bedworth United
5	Barnstaple Town	2–1	Dorchester Town
6	Barry Town	3–3	Bilston
7	Belper Town	0–1	Frickley Colliery
8	Biggleswade Town	3–4	Bletchley
9	Blaenau Ffestiniog	1–2	Connah's Quay Nomads
10	Bodmin Town	3–0	Chippenham Town
11	Boston	1–0	Holbeach United
12	Boston United	3–0	Selby Town
13	Bury Town	3–1	Ely City
14	Cambridge City	1–1	Soham Town Rangers
15	Canterbury City	2–0	Crawley Town
16	Droylsden	2–2	Stockton
17	Ellesmere Port Town	2–2	Nantwich Town
18	Gateshead	3–0	Bacup Borough
19	Gloucester City	3–1	Abergavenny Thursdays
20	Gresley Rovers	0–5	Alfreton Town
21	Great Yarmouth Town	1–3	Banbury United
22	Halesowen Town	1–3	Cinderford Town
23	Heanor Town	2–1	Dinnington Athletic
24	Horwich R M I	1–1	Fleetwood
25	Leyland Motors	0–1	Chorley
26	Lincoln United	0–3	Arnold
27	Lockheed Leamington	5–1	Lower Gornal Athletic
28	Loughborough United	0–1	Desborough Town
29	Louth United	2–2	Rugby Town
30	Lowestoft Town	2–3	Dunstable
31	March Town United	3–2	Potton United
32	Merthyr Tydfil	4–1	Brierley Hill Alliance
33	Mexborough Town	3–1	Newhall United
34	Netherfield	3–1	Boldon Colliery Welfare
35	Oswestry Town	1–1	Redditch United
36	Portmadoc	3–1	Holyhead Town
37	Prescot Town	1–1	Prestatyn
38	Ramsgate Athletic	4–1	Guildford City
39	Rossendale United	1–2	Horden Colliery Welfare
40	Runcorn	2–3	Rhyl
41	St Helens Town	2–3	Formby
42	Salisbury	3–1	Frome Town
43	Sandbach Ramblers	2–3	Witton Albion
44	Sheppey United	1–1	Bexley United
45	Skegness Town	1–2	Bourne Town
46	Spalding United	3–0	Stamford
47	Stevenage Athletic	2–1	Thetford Town
48	Sutton Town	2–4	Winterton Rangers
49	Ton Pentre	1–1	Lye Town
50	Tonbridge	3–1	Chatham Town
51	Trowbridge Town	3–1	Basingstoke Town
52	Wellingborough Town	1–1	Rushden Town
53	Welton Rovers	2–2	Bridport
54	Weston super Mare	1–1	St Blazey
55	Whitstable Town	2–1	Hatfield Town
56	Wisbech Town	2–2	St Neots Town
57	Worksop Town	1–1	Retford Town

=== Replays ===
Tie	Home team	Score	Away team
3	Clitheroe	1–4	Ashton United
6	Bilston	2–1	Barry Town
14	Cambridge City	4–0	Soham Town Rangers
16	Stockton	2–0	Droylsden
17	Nantwich Town	1–0	Ellesmere Port Town
24	Fleetwood	3–1	Horwich R M I
29	Rugby Town	4–1	Louth United
35	Redditch United	2–5	Oswestry Town
37	Prestatyn	1–1	Prescot Town
44	Bexley United	1–2	Sheppey United
49	Lye Town	1–3	Ton Pentre
52	Rushden Town	1–2	Wellingborough Town
53	Bridport	1–2	Welton Rovers
54	St Blazey	3–1	Weston–super–Mare
56	St Neots Town	0–1	Wisbech Town
57	Retford Town	5–1	Worksop Town

=== 2nd replay ===
Tie	Home team	Score	Away team
37	Prescot Town	1–3	Prestatyn

== Second qualifying round ==
=== Ties ===
Tie	Home team	Score	Away team
1	Alfreton Town	4–1	Mexborough Town
2	Arnold	4–2	Rugby Town
3	Banbury United	2–0	March Town United
4	Chorley	3–1	Gateshead
5	Cinderford Town	0–5	Bilston
6	Cowes	1–1	Wadebridge Town
7	Deal Town	2–0	Sittingbourne
8	Desborough Town	1–5	Bedworth United
9	Dunstable	0–2	Bletchley
10	Fleetwood	1–1	Netherfield
11	Gloucester City	0–0	Lockheed Leamington
12	Heanor Town	2–2	Ashby Institute
13	Horden Colliery Welfare	3–1	Darwen
14	Oswestry Town	3–1	Merthyr Tydfil
15	Portmadoc	3–1	Connah's Quay Nomads
16	Prestatyn	2–2	Bethesda Athletic
17	Ramsgate Athletic	5–1	Canterbury City
18	Retford Town	2–3	Frickley Colliery
19	Rhyl	1–0	Nantwich Town
20	Salisbury	5–1	Bodmin Town
21	Sheppey United	0–4	Ashford Town (Kent)
22	Spalding United	1–2	Bourne Town
23	Stevenage Athletic	0–3	Cambridge City
24	Stockton	3–0	Ashton United
25	Ton Pentre	0–0	Dudley Town
26	Tonbridge	7–2	Whitstable Town
27	Trowbridge Town	3–0	Barnstaple Town
28	Wellingborough Town	3–0	Boston
29	Welton Rovers	3–4	St Blazey
30	Winterton Rangers	0–1	Boston United
31	Wisbech Town	1–2	Bury Town
32	Witton Albion	5–0	Formby

=== Replays ===
Tie	Home team	Score	Away team
6	Wadebridge Town	4–2	Cowes
10	Netherfield	1–0	Fleetwood
11	Lockheed Leamington	1–2	Gloucester City
12	Ashby Institute	2–0	Heanor Town
16	Bethesda Athletic	7–3	Prestatyn
25	Dudley Town	0–3	Ton Pentre

== Third qualifying round ==
=== Ties ===
Tie	Home team	Score	Away team
1	Andover	1–3	Margate
2	Ashby Institute	1–2	Ilkeston Town
3	Banbury United	2–1	Gravesend & Northfleet
4	Bath City	0–2	Trowbridge Town
5	Bedworth United	4–0	Deal Town
6	Boston United	2–0	Alfreton Town
7	Bury Town	3–2	Ashford Town (Kent)
8	Corby Town	1–0	Cambridge City
9	Denaby United	1–1	Horden Colliery Welfare
10	Dover	2–1	Bletchley
11	Glastonbury	1–4	Poole Town
12	Gloucester City	1–0	Ton Pentre
13	Goole Town	3–0	Bridlington Town
14	Hednesford	3–2	New Brighton
15	Minehead	2–1	Cheltenham Town
16	Morecambe	1–2	Chorley
17	Northwich Victoria	4–1	Hyde United
18	Oswestry Town	3–4	Lancaster City
19	Portmadoc	0–1	Witton Albion
20	Ramsgate Athletic	1–2	Hastings United
21	Rhyl	0–0	South Liverpool
22	St Blazey	4–2	Wadebridge Town
23	Salisbury	0–1	Bilston
24	Scarborough	3–0	Frickley Colliery
25	Stalybridge Celtic	0–2	Altrincham
26	Stockton	3–2	Arnold
27	Tamworth	1–1	Bethesda Athletic
28	Taunton Town	0–1	Stourbridge
29	Thornycroft Athletic	1–1	Bedford Town
30	Tonbridge	3–0	Bourne Town
31	Wellingborough Town	3–3	King's Lynn
32	Winsford United	2–0	Netherfield

=== Replays ===
Tie	Home team	Score	Away team
9	Horden Colliery Welfare	4–3	Denaby United
21	South Liverpool	2–0	Rhyl
27	Bethesda Athletic	1–1	Tamworth
29	Bedford Town	1–0	Thornycroft Athletic
31	King's Lynn	2–1	Wellingborough Town

=== 2nd replay ===
Tie	Home team	Score	Away team
27	Tamworth	3–1	Bethesda Athletic

== 1st round ==
The teams that given byes to this round are Macclesfield Town, Bradford Park Avenue, Hillingdon Borough, Wimbledon, Worcester City, Romford, Weymouth, Yeovil Town, Wigan Athletic, Gainsborough Trinity, South Shields, Bangor City, Stafford Rangers, Great Harwood, Mossley, Kidderminster Harriers, Bromsgrove Rovers, Bridgwater Town, Kirkby Town, Burscough, Telford United, Chelmsford City, Barnet, Hereford United, Kettering Town, Nuneaton Borough, Dartford, Grantham, Mossley, Buxton, Bideford and Burton Albion.

=== Ties ===
Tie	Home team	Score	Away team
1	Altrincham	2–2	Chorley
2	Banbury United	4–1	Minehead
3	Bangor City	4–0	Horden Colliery Welfare
4	Bedworth United	1–2	Bilston
5	Boston United	2–2	Stockton
6	Bury Town	2–0	Nuneaton Borough
7	Buxton	3–0	Goole Town
8	Dover	2–0	Kettering Town
9	Great Harwood	2–3	Burscough
10	Hednesford	0–2	Mossley
11	Hereford United	3–1	Gloucester City
12	Hillingdon Borough	3–1	Corby Town
13	Ilkeston Town	1–3	South Shields
14	Kidderminster Harriers	3–0	Barnet
15	King's Lynn	1–2	Bedford Town
16	Lancaster City	1–1	Tamworth
17	Macclesfield Town	2–1	South Liverpool
18	Margate	0–0	Hastings United
19	Matlock Town	5–4	Gainsborough Trinity
20	Northwich Victoria	5–1	Kirkby Town
21	Romford	1–0	Poole Town
22	St Blazey	2–2	Bromsgrove Rovers
23	Stourbridge	4–3	Bridgwater Town
24	Telford United	6–1	Bradford Park Avenue
25	Trowbridge Town	1–6	Chelmsford City
26	Weymouth	1–1	Bideford
27	Wigan Athletic	2–0	Stafford Rangers
28	Wimbledon	1–1	Dartford
29	Winsford United	1–2	Burton Albion
30	Witton Albion	0–0	Scarborough
31	Worcester City	0–0	Tonbridge
32	Yeovil Town	3–1	Grantham

=== Replays ===
Tie	Home team	Score	Away team
1	Chorley	2–0	Altrincham
5	Stockton	0–2	Boston United
16	Tamworth	6–1	Lancaster City
18	Hastings United	7–2	Margate
22	Bromsgrove Rovers	3–2	St Blazey
26	Bideford	1–2	Weymouth
28	Dartford	2–3	Wimbledon
30	Scarborough	3–0	Witton Albion
31	Tonbridge	0–0	Worcester City

=== 2nd replays ===
Tie	Home team	Score	Away team
31	Worcester City	3–2	Tonbridge

== 2nd round ==
=== Ties ===
Tie	Home team	Score	Away team
1	Banbury United	0-0	Hastings Town
2	Bangor City	3-1	Northwich Victoria
3	Bilston	0-1	Tamworth
4	Boston United	0-1	Wigan Athletic
5	Burton Albion	2-1	Matlock Town
6	Buxton	2-0	Mossley
7	Chorley	1-0	Burscough
8	Dover	3-0	Bedford Town
9	Hereford United	2-0	Bury Town
10	Hillingdon Borough	2-1	Chelmsford City
11	Kidderminster Harriers	3-0	Worcester City
12	Macclesfield Town	0-0	Scarborough
13	Romford	1-1	Stourbridge
14	Telford United	7-1	South Shields
15	Wimbledon	4-0	Bromsgrove Rovers
16	Yeovil Town	0-0	Weymouth

=== Replays ===
Tie	Home team	Score	Away team
1	Hastings United	0-3	Banbury United
12	Scarborough	2-3	Macclesfield Town
13	Stourbridge	2-1	Romford
15	Weymouth	0-1	Yeovil Town

== 3rd round ==
=== Ties ===
Tie	Home team	Score	Away team
1	Banbury United	2-2	Hereford United
2	Bangor City	3-4	Tamworth
3	Burton Albion	0-2	Telford United
4	Buxton	1-0	Kidderminster Harriers
5	Chorley	0-0	Stourbridge
6	Macclesfield Town	1-0	Dover
7	Wigan Athletic	0-1	Hillingdon Borough
8	Wimbledon	1-1	Yeovil Town

=== Replays ===
Tie	Home team	Score	Away team
1	Hereford United	1-0	Banbury United
5	Stourbridge	2-0	Chorley
8	Yeovil Town	4-0	Wimbledon

== 4th round ==
=== Ties ===
Tie	Home team	Score	Away team
1	Buxton	1-1	Hillingdon Borough
2	Hereford United	2-0	Macclesfield Town
3	Tamworth	1-1	Telford United
4	Yeovil Town	2-0	Stourbridge

=== Replays ===
Tie	Home team	Score	Away team
1	Hillingdon Borough	2-0	Buxton
3	Telford United	6-1	Tamworth

== Semi finals ==
=== Ties ===
Tie	Home team	Score	Away team
1	Hillingdon Borough	2-0	Hereford United
2	Telford United	3-1	Yeovil Town

== Final ==
1 May 1971

Telford United	3-2	Hillingdon Borough
Joey Owen 53'; Jack Bentley 81'; Mickey Fudge 86'		Johnny Bishop

Wembley Stadium, London
Attendance: 29,500
