= King's Lynn F.C. =

Coordinates: 52°44′58.6″N 0°24′29.2″E

- Full name: King's Lynn Football Club
- Nickname: The Linnets
- Founded: 30 August 1881
- Dissolved: 2009
- Ground: The Walks, King's Lynn
- Capacity: 5,733 (1,200 seated)
Home colours	Away colours

King's Lynn Football Club was an English association football club based in King's Lynn, Norfolk. The club was founded in 1881 and they were wound up at the High Court on 25 November 2009 with debts of £77,000, going out of business in December after a failed appeal. The club was re-formed in January 2010 as Lynn FC and later renamed King's Lynn Town.

== History ==
It is not known when King's Lynn first had a football club although there is mention of one existing in 1868. That club ceased playing in the middle of the following decade. A new club was formed at a meeting on 30 August 1881. In 1882–83 they won the Norfolk Senior Cup and went on to win it three more times in the next seven years. In 1897 they were founder members of the Norfolk & Suffolk League and were champions four times before World War I. After the war they won four consecutive titles between 1921–22 and 1924–25. During this period the club also played in the East Anglian League, and were league runners-up in 1908–09

In 1935 Lynn were founder members of the Eastern Counties League. They left in 1946 to join the United Counties League, but returned to the ECL in 1948. During the 1949–50 season they set the league's record attendance of 8,387 for a local derby with Wisbech Town, and also set their own record later in the season when 12,931 saw them play Exeter City in the FA Cup. In 1953–54 they won the league and league cup, and at the end of the season stepped up to the Midland League. Four years later they joined the Southern League when it added a second division, becoming members of the South East Division for a transitional season. During their first season in the Southern League, the club reached the first round of the FA Cup, where they defeated Merthyr Tydfil 2–1 to reach the second round for the first time, going on to lose 3–1 at Brentford. At the end of the season, they qualified for a place in the Southern Division of the Premier League for 1959–60 season. The new season saw them defeat Football League opposition in the FA Cup for the first time, beating Aldershot 2–1 in the first round, before losing 4–2 at Reading in the second round.

The 1961–62 season saw King's Lynn reach the FA Cup third round for the first and only time. After beating Chelmsford City 2–1 in the first round, they defeated Coventry City by the same scoreline at Highfield Road. In the third round the club were drawn away to Everton, where they lost 4–0. The club ended the league season by being relegated to Division One but returned to the Premier Division after finishing second in 1963–64. They won four successive East Anglian Cups between 1964–65 and 1967–68, but were relegated again at the end of the 1970–71 season.

In 1980 the club transferred to the Northern Premier League, winning the President's Cup in their third season in the league. In 1983 they returned to the Southern League and won the East Anglian Cup again in 1984–85. They were relegated to the Midland Division at the end of the 1986–87 season, where they remained until finishing second in 1995–96 and earning promotion back to the Premier Division. They were relegated again in 2001–02, but returned to the Premier Division after winning Division One East in 2003–04. They won the League Cup in 2004–05 and qualified for the promotion play-offs in 2005–06 and 2006–07, but lost on both occasions. Although they were promoted to the Conference North as champions in 2007–08, they were demoted a year later due to ground grading issues. Midway through their first season back in the Northern Premier League the club folded due to financial difficulties.

== Reserves ==
King's Lynn reserves played in the Peterborough & District League between 1928 and 1954, winning the title in 1950–51 and 1953–54. They then spent a season in the United Counties League, before returning to the Peterborough & District League. After a third title in 1956–57 they left to join the Central Alliance. However, after applying for the reserve team to join the Eastern Counties League every year since 1956, they were finally successful in 1959. They remained in the ECL until 1971 when they returned to the Peterborough & District League. They won the Norfolk Senior Cup in 1982–83 and the league title in 1984–85. They returned to the ECL when it added a second division in 1988, and although they left in 1993, they returned again the following season. After disbanding in 1996 they were soon reformed and joined the reserve section of the United Counties League. They rejoined Division One of the ECL again in 2001 and were promoted to the Premier Division after finishing second in 2002–03. They withdrew from the ECL when the club folded in 2009.

On reformation the club won the United Counties League Reserve Division One in 2011 and United Counties League Reserve Premier Division in 2012.

== Stadium ==
King's Lynn played at the Walks for their entire existence, with the stadium name deriving from the area of park located next to the stadium. At the end of the 2008–09 season the club were informed that they would be relegated from the Conference North because the Walks failed to meet Conference North standards, although the remedial work was completed by the start of the following season.

== Honours ==
- Northern Premier League
  - Presidents Cup winners 1982–83
- Southern League
  - Premier Division champions 2007–08
  - Division One East champions 2003–04
  - League Cup winners 2004–05
- Eastern Counties League
  - Champions 1953–54
  - League Cup winners 1953–54
- Norfolk & Suffolk League
  - Champions 1905–06, 1921–22, 1922–23, 1923–24, 1924–25
- Norfolk Senior Cup
  - Winners 1882–83, 1884–85, 1886–87, 1889–90, 1899–1900, 1907–08, 1923–24, 1924–25, 1931–32, 1933–34, 1936–37, 1938–39, 1951–52, 1952–53, 1953–54, 1954–55, 1955–56, 1956–57, 1957–58, 1982–83, 2008–09
- East Anglian Cup
  - Winners 1964–65, 1965–66, 1966–67, 1967–68, 1984–85

== Records ==
- Attendance: 12,937 vs Exeter City, FA Cup first round, 1951–52
- Biggest win: 17–0 vs Beccles, Norfolk & Suffolk League, 19 April 1930
- Heaviest defeat: 0–11 vs Aston Villa, FA Cup first round 1905–06
- Appearances: Mick Wright, 1,152 (British record)
- Goalscorer: Malcolm Lindsay, 321
- Goals in a season: George Martin, 69 from 38 appearances (1909–10)
- Goals in a match: Harry Kirk, 8 vs City Wanderers, 15 April 1925
- Transfer fee paid: £5,000 for Lyndon Rowland from Halesowen Town, November 1999
- Transfer fee received: £60,000 for Mark Paul from Southampton, 1998–99
