= Bexley United F.C. =

Bexley United
- Full name: Bexley United Football Club
- Founded: c. 1952
- Dissolved: 1976
- Ground: Park View Road, Welling
- League: Southern League Div One South
- 1975–76: 7th

Bexley United Football Club was a football club based in Welling.

A club of the same name played in the Kent League before the war, before merging with Bexley. It was resurrected as Bexleyheath and Welling in about 1952 following a local campaign, and joined the Kent League.

In 1959, the club was elected to the Southern Football League Division One. It gained promotion to the Southern League Premier Division in 1961 and also won the Kent Senior Cup for the only time. In 1963, the team changed its name to Bexley United.

Four seasons after promotion into the Premier Division, Bexley found itself relegated back into Division One, staying there for the rest of the club's life, except for a move into the Division One South when the league structure was altered. At that point, the club got into financial trouble and never truly recovered. Bexley played its final game in April 1976 in front of 222 spectators.

== Former players ==
Michael Hanson, club record number of appearances (540+).

== See also ==
- Welling United F.C. – a successor to Bexley United
