= List of Aldershot F.C. seasons =

Aldershot Football Club, a professional association football club based in Aldershot, Hampshire, England, was founded in 1926 and dissolved in 1992. They were elected to play in the Southern Football League for the 1927–28 season. After five seasons in the Southern League, Aldershot were elected to play in the Football League in 1932 and were placed in the Third Division South. In their first season in the Football League the team reached the fifth round of the 1932–33 FA Cup, which is the joint-furthest the club have reached in the competition along with the 1978–79 edition. Aldershot played in the Third Division South until the 1958–59 season, when they were placed in the Fourth Division on league reorganisation. They won the first promotion in their history in the 1972–73 season, after finishing fourth in the Fourth Division. They were relegated from the Third Division after three seasons in 1976. Their final promotion came in 1987 when they won the Football League Fourth Division play-off final, but were relegated two years later finishing bottom of the 1988–89 Football League Third Division. In 1992 the club were dissolved after bankruptcy and their record for the 1991–92 season was expunged, in response to the bankruptcy a group of supporters set up a new club, Aldershot Town.

== Key ==
Key to divisions

- Southern League – Southern Football League
- Division 2 – Football League Second Division
- Division 3 – Football League Third Division
- Division SN – Football League Third Division South
- Division 4 – Football League Fourth Division

Key to symbols

- ↑ = Promoted
- ↓ = Relegated

Key to rounds

- N/A – Competition not held
- QR2 – Second qualifying round
- PR(S) – Preliminary round Southern section
- R1 – First round, etc.
- R1(S) – First round Southern section
- QF(S) – Quarter-final Southern section
- F(S) – Final Southern section
- W – Winners

== Seasons ==
Season	League									FA Cup	League Cup (Note: The Football League Cup competition started in the 1960–61 season.)	Other		Top league scorer(s)	
Season	Division	P	W	D	L	F	A	Pts	Pos	FA Cup	League Cup	Competition	Result	Player(s)	Goals
1927–28	Southern League	34	17	5	12	85	66	39	7th	R2	N/A	—	—		
1928–29	Southern League	36	18	5	13	68	52	41	6th	QR2	N/A	—	—		
1929–30	Southern League	32	21	6	5	84	39	48	1st	R1	N/A	—	—		
1930–31	Southern League	16	10	3	3	50	28	23	2nd	R3	N/A	London Combination	W		
1931–32	Southern League	18	3	5	10	17	30	11	9th	R2	N/A	London Combination	6th		
1932–33	Division 3S (Note: Aldershot were elected to the Football League Third Division South for the 1932–33 season.)	42	13	10	19	61	72	36	17th	R5	N/A	—	—	Fred Gamble	15
1933–34	Division 3S	42	13	12	17	52	71	38	14th	R3	N/A	Third Division South Cup	R3	John Nicol	11
1934–35	Division 3S	42	13	10	19	50	75	36	18th	R3	N/A	Third Division South Cup	R2	Jack Oakes	16
1935–36	Division 3S	42	14	12	16	53	61	38	11th	R1	N/A	Third Division South Cup	R2	Bert Lutterloch; Len Williams	13
1936–37	Division 3S	42	7	9	26	50	89	23	22nd	R1	N/A	Third Division South Cup	R2	Cecil Ray	13
1937–38	Division 3S	42	15	5	22	39	59	35	18th	R3	N/A	Third Division South Cup	R1	Harry Egan	13
1938–39	Division 3S	42	16	12	14	53	66	44	10th	R2	N/A	Third Division South Cup	R2	Cecil Ray	22
No competitive football was played between 1939 and 1945 due to the Second World War
1945–46	N/A (Note: The FA Cup returned this season but the Football League did not resume until the following season.)									R4 (Note: From the first round to the sixth round of the 1945–46 FA Cup, matches were played over two legs.)	N/A	—	—	N/A	
1946–47	Division 3S	42	10	12	20	48	78	32	20th	R2	N/A	—	—	H Brooks	14
1947–48	Division 3S	42	10	15	17	45	67	35	19th	R2	N/A	—	—	RG Hood; J White	8
1948–49	Division 3S	42	11	11	20	48	59	33	21st	R3	N/A	—	—	F Rawcliffe	14
1949–50	Division 3S	42	13	8	21	48	60	34	20th	R1	N/A	—	—	CT Mortimore	15
1950–51	Division 3S	46	15	10	21	56	88	40	18th	R3	N/A	—	—	K Flint	11
1951–52	Division 3S	46	18	8	20	78	89	44	12th	R2	N/A	—	—	RR Raine	13
1952–53	Division 3S	46	12	15	19	61	77	39	19th	R1	N/A	—	—	N Menzies	14
1953–54	Division 3S	46	17	9	20	74	86	39	17th	R2	N/A	—	—	ABR McCulloch	19
1954–55	Division 3S	46	16	13	17	75	71	45	14th	R2	N/A	—	—		
1955–56	Division 3S	46	12	16	18	70	90	40	15th	R3	N/A	—	—		
1956–57	Division 3S	46	15	12	19	79	92	42	19th	R1	N/A	—	—		
1957–58	Division 3S	46	12	16	18	59	89	40	18th	R3	N/A	—	—		
1958–59	Division 4 (Note: Aldershot were placed in the Football League Fourth Division on League reorganisation.)	46	14	7	25	63	97	35	22nd	R1	N/A	—	—		
1959–60	Division 4	46	18	9	19	77	74	45	13th	R1	N/A	—	—		
1960–61	Division 4	46	18	9	19	79	69	45	10th	R4	R2	—	—		
1961–62	Division 4	44	22	5	17	81	60	49	7th	R2	R1	—	—		
1962–63	Division 4	46	15	17	14	73	69	47	11th	R2	R2	—	—		
1963–64	Division 4	46	19	10	17	83	78	48	9th	R4	R2	—	—		
1964–65	Division 4	46	15	7	24	64	84	37	18th	R2	R1	—	—		
1965–66	Division 4	46	15	10	21	75	84	40	17th	R2	R2	—	—		
1966–67	Division 4	46	18	12	16	72	57	48	10th	R3	R2	—	—		
1967–68	Division 4	46	18	17	11	70	55	53	9th	R1	R1	—	—		
1968–69	Division 4	46	19	7	20	66	66	45	15th	R1	R1	—	—		
1969–70	Division 4	46	20	13	13	78	65	53	6th	R4	R1	—	—		
1970–71	Division 4	46	14	17	15	66	71	45	13th	R3	R2	Watney Cup	R1		
1971–72	Division 4	46	9	22	15	48	54	40	17th	R2	R2	—	—		
1972–73	Division 4 ↑	46	22	12	12	60	38	56	4th	R2	R1	—	—		
1973–74	Division 3	46	19	11	16	65	52	49	8th	R2	R1	—	—		
1974–75	Division 3	46	14	11	21	53	63	38 (Note: Aldershot were deducted one point for fielding an illegible player.)	20th	R1	R1	—	—		
1975–76	Division 3 ↓	46	13	13	20	59	75	39	21st	R3	R1	—	—		
1976–77	Division 4	46	16	11	19	49	59	43	17th	R1	R1	—	—		
1977–78	Division 4	46	19	16	11	67	47	55	5th	R1	R1	—	—		
1978–79	Division 4	46	20	17	9	63	47	57	5th	R5	R1	—	—	John Dungworth	26
1979–80	Division 4	46	16	13	17	62	53	45	10th	R3	R1	—	—		
1980–81	Division 4	46	18	14	14	43	41	50	6th	R1	R1	—	—		
1981–82	Division 4	46	13	15	18	57	68	54	16th	R2	R2	Football League Group Cup	R1		
1982–83	Division 4	46	12	15	19	61	82	51	18th	R3	R1	Football League Trophy	R1		
1983–84	Division 4	46	22	9	15	76	69	75	5th	R1	R2	Associate Members' Cup	R1(S)		
1984–85	Division 4	46	17	8	21	56	63	59	13th	R2	R3	Associate Members' Cup	R1(S)		
1985–86	Division 4	46	17	7	22	66	74	58	16th	R1	R1	Associate Members' Cup	PR(S)		
1986–87	Division 4 ↑	46	20	10	16	64	57	70	6th (Note: Promoted to the Football League Third Division via the play-offs, beating Bolton Wanderers 3–2 on aggregate in the semi-final and Wolverhampton Wanderers 3–0 on aggregate in the final.)	R4	R1	Associate Members' Cup	F(S)		
1987–88	Division 3	46	15	8	23	64	74	53	20th	R1	R1	Associate Members' Cup	QF(S)		
1988–89	Division 3 ↓	46	8	13	25	48	78	37	24th	R2	R1	Associate Members' Cup	PR(S)		
1989–90	Division 4	46	12	14	20	49	69	50	22nd	R1	R2	Associate Members' Cup	R1(S)		
1990–91	Division 4	46	10	11	25	61	101	41	23rd	R3	R1	Associate Members' Cup	R1(S)		
1991–92	Division 4	N/A (Note: Aldershot were expelled from the Football League but were re-founded as Aldershot Town.)								R1	R1	Associate Members' Cup	PR(S)		
