= 1929–30 Southern Football League =

The 1929–30 season was the 32nd in the history of the Southern League. The league consisted of Eastern and Western Divisions. Aldershot Town won the Eastern Division and Bath City won the Western Division. Aldershot were declared Southern League champions after winning a championship play-off 4–2.

Three clubs from the Southern League applied to join the Football League, with Thames Association being successful. They replaced Merthyr Town, who rejoined the Southern League the following season. In addition to Thames, a total of 12 clubs left the Southern League at the end of this season.

== Eastern Division ==
Southern Football League Eastern Division
- Season: 1929–30
- Champions: Aldershot Town (1st title)
- Promoted: Thames Association
- Relegated: Northampton Town II (resigned); Southampton II (resigned); Kettering Town (resigned); Bournemouth & Boscombe Athletic II (resigned); Brighton & Hove Albion II (resigned); Sittingbourne (resigned); Northfleet United (resigned); Grays Thurrock United (resigned); Poole (resigned)
- Matches: 272
- Goals: 1,134 (4.17 per match)

A total of 19 teams contest the division, including 18 sides from previous season and one new team.

Newly elected team:

- Northampton Town II - returned to the league after the resignation in 1925

Pos	Team	Pld	W	D	L	GF	GA	GR	Pts	Qualification or relegation
1	Aldershot Town	32	21	6	5	84	39	2.154	48	
2	Millwall II	32	21	3	8	75	56	1.339	45	
3	Thames Association	32	17	6	9	80	60	1.333	40	Elected to the Football League Third Division South
4	Peterborough & Fletton United	32	18	3	11	66	39	1.692	39	
5	Northampton Town II	32	17	4	11	86	60	1.433	38	Left league at end of season
6	Southampton II	32	14	7	11	73	62	1.177	35	Left league at end of season
7	Sheppey United	32	15	5	12	76	69	1.101	35	
8	Kettering Town	32	13	7	12	70	69	1.014	33	Left league at end of season
9	Dartford	32	14	5	13	57	59	0.966	33	
10	Norwich City II	32	14	3	15	69	63	1.095	31	
11	Guildford City	32	13	2	17	65	97	0.670	28	
12	Bournemouth & Boscombe Athletic II	32	10	7	15	59	63	0.937	27	Left league at end of season
13	Brighton & Hove Albion II	32	12	2	18	56	79	0.709	26	Left league at end of season
14	Folkestone	32	13	0	19	56	82	0.683	26	
15	Sittingbourne	32	10	5	17	55	59	0.932	25	Left league at end of season
16	Northfleet United	32	6	7	19	53	77	0.688	19	Left league at end of season
17	Grays Thurrock United	32	7	2	23	54	101	0.535	16	Left league at end of season
18	Poole	0	0	0	0	0	0	—	0	Resigned after 30 matches, record expunged

Rules for classification: The system of using goal average to separate two teams tied on points was used up until the 1976–77 season. The points system: 2 points for a win, 1 point for a draw and 0 points for losing.

== Western Division ==
Southern Football League Western Division
- Season: 1929–30
- Champions: Bath City
- Promoted: none
- Relegated: Yeovil & Petters United (resigned); Lovells Athletic (resigned); Bristol City II (resigned)
- Matches: 210
- Goals: 932 (4.44 per match)

A total of 15 teams contest the division, including 14 sides from previous season and one new team.

Newly elected team:

- Llanelly - returned to the league after the resignation in 1925

Pos	Team	Pld	W	D	L	GF	GA	GR	Pts	Result
1	Bath City	28	16	6	6	85	52	1.635	38	
2	Bristol Rovers II	28	16	4	8	66	50	1.320	36	
3	Taunton Town	28	14	7	7	50	40	1.250	35	
4	Barry	28	15	3	10	65	55	1.182	33	
5	Yeovil & Petters United	28	12	7	9	63	47	1.340	31	Left league at end of season
6	Plymouth Argyle II	28	14	3	11	68	52	1.308	31	
7	Newport County II	28	13	4	11	68	76	0.895	30	
8	Lovells Athletic	28	13	2	13	59	57	1.035	28	Left league at end of season
9	Exeter City II	28	11	6	11	49	54	0.907	28	
10	Bristol City II	28	11	5	12	59	63	0.937	27	Left league at end of season
11	Swindon Town II	28	10	6	12	69	67	1.030	26	
12	Torquay United II	28	10	6	12	76	77	0.987	26	
13	Llanelly	28	10	4	14	55	52	1.058	24	
14	Ebbw Vale	28	5	6	17	52	97	0.536	16	
15	Merthyr Town II	28	5	1	22	48	93	0.516	11	Replaced by first team at end of season

Rules for classification: The system of using goal average to separate two teams tied on points was used up until the 1976–77 season. The points system: 2 points for a win, 1 point for a draw and 0 points for losing.

== Football League election ==
Three Southern League clubs, Aldershot Town, Thames Association and Llanelly, applied to join the Football League. Thames were successful, finishing second in the ballot. Aldershot also finished above Third Division South club Merthyr Town, who replaced their reserves in the Western Division the following season.

Club	League	Votes
Gillingham	Football League	33
Thames Association	Southern League	20
Aldershot Town	Southern League	19
Merthyr Town	Football League	14
Llanelly	Southern League	4
Argonauts	None	0
