= Fulham F.C. league record by opponent =

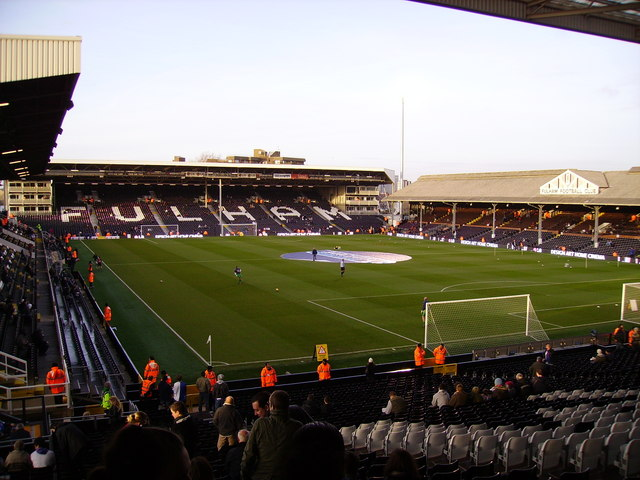
Craven Cottage has been Fulham's home stadium since 1896. For a short while at the beginning of the 2000s, Fulham played at Loftus Road whilst their own ground was being re-developed to Premiership standards.

This article shows the record of Fulham Football Club against each of the Football League clubs they have played against in all four divisions since 1907. Although formed in 1879, Fulham were not elected to the Football League until 1907. They have played 106 clubs in the Football League since 1907 in all Divisions.

== Key ==
- The table includes results of matches played by Fulham in the English Football League since 1907 to date. Wartime matches are regarded as unofficial and are excluded, as are matches from the abandoned 1939–40 season. FA Cup games, Championship play-off matches and test matches are also not included, and matches in the Southern Football League (1899 to 1907) are not included because exact records are hard to locate.
- For the sake of simplicity, present-day names are used throughout: for example, results against Ardwick, Small Heath and Woolwich Arsenal are integrated into the records against Manchester City, Birmingham City and Arsenal, respectively.
- Fulham have played a total of 4,486 games in the Football League since 1907.
- Pld = matches played; W = matches won; D = matches drawn; L = matches lost; GF = goals for; GA = goals against; Win% = percentage of total matches won.

== List ==
All statistics are correct through matches played up to May 25th 2025. Clubs currently in the Premier League are indicated in the far right column. ‡ Indicates defunct FA team.

Fulham F.C. league record by opponent
Club	Home						Away						Total						Win%	Note(s)
Club	Pld	W	D	L	GF	GA	Pld	W	D	L	GF	GA	Pld	W	D	L	GF	GA	Win%	Note(s)
Aldershot	2	1	0	1	6	3	2	2	0	0	5	1	4	3	0	1	11	4	75.00	
Arsenal	32	9	6	17	39	60	32	0	7	25	29	78	64	9	13	42	68	138	14.06	Premier League
Aston Villa	36	18	11	7	58	41	36	5	10	21	33	61	72	23	21	28	91	102	31.94	Premier League
Barnet	4	3	1	0	11	1	4	1	2	1	4	5	8	4	3	1	15	6	50.00	
Barnsley	42	20	13	9	73	42	42	7	11	24	48	87	84	27	24	33	121	129	32.14	
Barrow	1	1	0	0	2	1	1	0	0	1	1	3	2	1	0	1	3	4	50.00	
Birmingham City	43	17	13	13	66	50	43	12	13	18	63	68	86	29	26	31	129	118	33.72	
Blackburn Rovers	44	19	15	10	83	58	44	11	7	26	44	73	88	30	22	36	127	131	34.09	
Blackpool	52	24	18	10	75	45	52	11	14	27	54	88	104	35	32	37	130	135	33.65	
Bolton Wanderers	41	21	11	9	70	43	41	9	13	19	44	55	82	30	24	28	114	98	36.59	
Bournemouth	18	5	8	5	25	26	18	3	4	11	17	31	36	8	12	16	42	57	22.22	Premier League
Bradford City	18	7	8	3	27	13	18	3	7	8	16	22	36	10	15	11	43	35	27.78	
Bradford (Park Avenue)	17	10	4	3	36	21	17	7	5	5	25	22	34	17	9	8	61	43	50.00	
Brentford	28	11	11	6	45	37	28	11	5	12	35	45	56	22	16	18	80	82	39.29	Premier League
Brighton & Hove Albion	25	17	1	7	51	22	25	5	6	14	22	47	50	22	7	21	73	69	44.00	Premier League
Bristol City	30	15	6	9	51	34	30	11	9	10	38	37	60	26	15	19	89	71	43.33	
Bristol Rovers	26	15	5	6	60	37	26	5	7	14	30	50	52	20	12	20	90	87	38.46	
Burnley	45	25	9	11	86	56	45	5	9	31	39	96	90	30	18	42	125	152	33.33	Premier League
Burton Albion	2	1	1	0	7	1	2	1	0	1	3	2	4	2	1	1	10	3	50.00	
Bury	34	18	9	7	68	35	34	6	11	17	35	55	68	24	20	24	103	90	35.29	
Cambridge United	8	3	1	4	11	10	8	1	2	5	2	11	16	4	3	9	13	21	25.00	
Cardiff City	32	16	6	10	59	48	32	11	7	14	42	45	64	27	13	24	101	93	42.19	
Carlisle United	16	9	1	6	27	15	16	4	3	9	19	31	32	13	4	15	46	46	40.63	
Charlton Athletic	30	15	9	6	43	31	30	6	13	11	34	46	60	21	22	17	77	77	35.00	
Chelsea	40	6	9	25	40	72	40	3	14	23	27	61	80	9	23	48	67	133	11.25	Premier League
Chester	11	7	2	2	18	11	11	5	3	3	14	17	22	12	5	5	32	28	54.55	
Chesterfield	18	10	7	1	29	14	18	4	5	9	15	25	36	14	12	10	44	39	38.89	
Colchester United	5	3	1	1	8	4	5	1	1	3	8	12	10	4	2	4	16	16	40.00	
Coventry City	18	9	5	4	32	18	18	6	2	10	22	32	36	15	7	14	54	50	41.67	
Crewe Alexandra	4	3	1	0	8	2	4	2	2	0	7	5	8	5	3	0	15	7	62.50	
Crystal Palace	25	10	9	6	38	33	25	8	9	8	32	31	50	18	18	14	70	64	36.00	Premier League
Darlington	7	6	1	0	24	5	7	3	2	2	7	10	14	9	3	2	31	15	64.29	
Derby County	29	12	13	4	47	28	29	4	8	17	36	69	58	16	21	21	83	97	27.59	
Doncaster Rovers	17	9	4	4	35	18	17	5	6	6	20	23	34	14	10	10	55	41	41.18	
Everton	31	15	8	8	41	31	31	3	5	23	24	67	62	18	13	31	65	98	29.03	Premier League
Exeter City	13	6	5	2	24	14	13	6	1	6	21	18	26	12	6	8	45	32	46.15	
Gainsborough Trinity	5	4	0	1	18	2	5	2	2	1	6	6	10	6	2	2	24	8	60.00	
Gillingham	16	9	4	3	26	15	16	4	2	10	16	27	32	13	6	13	42	42	40.63	
Glossop North End	8	5	1	2	18	9	8	3	2	3	6	7	16	8	3	5	24	16	50.00	
Grimsby Town	25	14	4	7	49	30	25	8	5	12	36	34	50	22	9	19	85	64	44.00	
Halifax Town	2	2	0	0	5	2	2	1	0	1	9	2	4	3	0	1	14	4	75.00	
Hartlepool United	6	4	1	1	8	5	6	3	0	3	7	6	12	7	1	4	15	11	58.33	
Hereford United	4	2	2	0	6	2	4	0	2	2	1	3	8	2	4	2	7	5	25.00	
Huddersfield Town	34	19	9	6	58	34	34	10	6	18	43	56	68	29	15	24	101	90	42.65	
Hull City	45	20	14	11	69	33	45	10	12	23	39	75	90	30	26	34	108	108	33.33	
Ipswich Town	13	5	5	3	31	16	13	6	3	4	21	16	26	11	8	7	52	32	42.31	
Leeds United	38	20	6	12	65	48	38	11	10	17	40	59	76	31	16	29	105	107	40.79	Premier League
Leicester City	40	24	10	6	83	46	40	18	5	17	60	73	80	42	15	23	143	119	52.50	
Leyton Orient	41	18	14	9	66	41	41	11	11	19	38	51	82	29	25	28	104	92	35.37	
Lincoln City	22	15	4	3	53	22	22	7	4	11	27	46	44	22	8	14	80	68	50.00	
Liverpool	32	10	8	14	43	50	32	2	8	22	22	73	64	12	16	36	65	123	18.75	Premier League
Luton Town	27	19	3	5	60	29	27	9	3	15	36	50	54	28	6	20	96	79	51.85	
Macclesfield Town	1	1	0	0	1	0	1	1	0	0	1	0	2	2	0	0	2	0	100.00	
Manchester City	34	9	9	16	56	69	34	6	6	22	39	86	68	15	15	38	95	155	22.06	Premier League
Manchester United	39	10	11	18	50	68	39	3	5	31	32	86	78	13	16	49	82	154	16.67	Premier League
Mansfield Town	13	5	6	2	16	12	13	4	4	5	15	18	26	9	10	7	31	30	34.62	
Merthyr Town ‡	2	2	0	0	9	4	2	1	0	1	5	7	4	3	0	1	14	11	75.00	
Middlesbrough	33	17	5	11	51	45	33	9	7	17	34	55	66	26	12	28	85	100	39.39	
Millwall	22	13	4	5	33	15	22	7	8	7	26	26	44	20	12	12	59	41	45.45	
Milton Keynes Dons	1	1	0	0	2	1	1	0	1	0	1	1	2	1	1	0	3	2	50.00	
Nelson ‡	1	0	1	0	0	0	1	0	1	0	1	1	2	0	2	0	1	1	0.00	
Newcastle United	37	21	5	11	68	56	37	10	10	17	43	59	74	31	15	28	111	115	41.89	Premier League
Newport County	7	5	0	2	15	8	7	2	3	2	13	12	14	7	3	4	28	20	50.00	
Northampton Town	13	5	4	4	21	22	13	4	3	6	19	23	26	9	7	10	40	45	34.62	
Norwich City	22	11	6	5	45	24	22	9	7	6	32	28	44	20	13	11	77	52	45.45	
Nottingham Forest	50	30	11	9	93	44	50	14	14	22	65	89	100	44	25	31	158	133	44.00	Premier League
Notts County	29	22	3	4	80	33	29	6	10	13	27	54	58	28	13	17	107	87	48.28	
Oldham Athletic	24	13	6	5	37	22	24	6	5	13	27	39	48	19	11	18	64	61	39.58	
Oxford United	9	3	4	2	8	8	9	1	2	6	6	12	18	4	6	8	14	20	22.22	
Peterborough United	2	1	0	1	2	2	2	1	0	1	2	4	4	2	0	2	4	6	50.00	
Plymouth Argyle	26	14	7	5	59	35	26	3	7	16	31	60	52	17	14	21	90	95	32.69	
Portsmouth	26	8	8	10	32	33	26	6	9	11	27	43	52	14	17	21	59	76	26.92	
Port Vale	23	12	6	5	54	30	23	8	7	8	25	37	46	20	13	13	79	67	43.48	
Preston North End	34	19	6	9	53	33	34	12	7	15	43	47	68	31	13	24	96	80	45.59	
Queens Park Rangers	18	9	2	7	37	23	18	7	4	7	19	20	36	16	6	14	56	43	44.44	
Reading	23	11	5	7	39	29	23	8	5	10	36	29	46	19	10	17	75	58	41.30	
Rochdale	5	3	2	0	11	2	5	4	1	0	8	4	10	7	3	0	19	6	70.00	
Rotherham United	24	14	7	3	48	22	24	8	7	9	34	38	48	22	14	12	82	60	45.83	
Scarborough ‡	3	2	0	1	6	2	3	1	1	1	5	5	6	3	1	2	11	7	50.00	
Scunthorpe United	4	2	1	1	5	5	4	3	0	1	9	6	8	5	1	2	14	11	62.50	
Sheffield United	31	17	6	8	68	37	31	6	8	17	31	57	62	23	14	25	99	94	37.10	
Sheffield Wednesday	35	20	6	9	71	41	35	6	11	18	39	65	70	26	17	27	110	106	37.14	
Shrewsbury Town	10	7	1	2	19	8	10	2	4	4	9	15	20	9	5	6	28	23	45.00	
Southampton	33	17	13	3	48	32	33	3	8	22	33	73	66	20	21	25	81	105	30.30	
Southend United	9	5	2	2	14	12	9	4	3	2	11	9	18	9	5	4	25	21	50.00	
Southport	1	1	0	0	3	2	1	1	0	0	2	0	2	2	0	0	5	2	100.00	
South Shields	9	4	3	2	13	8	9	0	1	8	5	19	18	4	4	10	18	27	22.22	
Stockport County	21	17	1	3	54	14	21	8	3	10	28	29	42	25	4	13	82	43	59.52	
Stoke City	38	21	7	10	67	42	38	12	8	18	40	64	76	33	15	28	107	106	43.42	
Sunderland	29	12	6	11	40	40	29	6	11	12	29	38	58	18	17	23	69	78	31.03	Premier League
Swansea City	33	24	2	7	87	36	33	9	7	17	48	69	66	33	9	24	135	105	50.00	
Swindon Town	11	7	2	2	25	11	11	3	4	4	17	22	22	10	6	6	42	33	45.45	
Thames ‡	2	2	0	0	12	2	2	0	2	0	0	0	4	2	2	0	12	2	50.00	
Torquay United	10	8	1	1	30	8	10	3	2	5	15	19	20	11	3	6	45	27	55.00	
Tottenham Hotspur	40	10	12	18	51	61	40	3	14	23	32	73	80	13	26	41	83	134	16.25	Premier League
Tranmere Rovers	7	4	1	2	10	6	7	3	2	2	11	6	14	7	3	4	21	12	50.00	
Walsall	14	9	5	0	33	12	14	4	7	3	21	22	28	13	12	3	54	34	46.43	
Watford	11	5	3	3	26	14	11	3	3	5	18	23	22	8	6	8	44	37	36.36	
West Bromwich Albion	39	18	10	11	58	30	39	8	10	21	42	81	78	26	20	32	100	111	33.33	
West Ham United	46	20	10	16	77	57	46	9	10	27	54	93	92	29	20	43	131	150	31.52	Premier League
Wigan Athletic	23	14	7	2	39	18	23	6	11	6	25	24	46	20	18	8	64	42	43.48	
Wimbledon	4	2	1	1	8	5	4	2	1	1	7	3	8	4	2	2	15	8	50.00	
Wolverhampton Wanderers	45	18	11	16	66	54	45	6	13	26	45	87	90	24	24	42	111	141	26.67	Premier League
Wrexham	6	2	2	2	3	4	6	2	3	1	9	6	12	4	5	3	12	10	33.33	
Wycombe Wanderers	2	1	1	0	2	0	2	0	1	1	1	3	4	1	2	1	3	3	25.00	
York City	7	3	2	2	10	8	7	3	1	3	10	8	14	6	3	5	20	16	42.86	
