= 1926–27 Southern Football League =

The 1926–27 season was the 29th in the history of the Southern League. The league consisted of Eastern and Western Divisions. Brighton & Hove Albion II won the Eastern Division and Torquay United won the Western Division. Brighton reserves were declared Southern League champions after defeating Torquay 4–0 in a championship play-off.

Four clubs from the Southern League applied to join the Football League, with Torquay being successful in a second round of voting. Five clubs (all reserve teams) left the league at the end of the season.

== Eastern Division ==
Southern Football League Eastern Division
- Season: 1926–27
- Champions: Brighton & Hove Albion II (2nd title)
- Promoted: none
- Relegated: Portsmouth II (resigned); Reading II (resigned); Luton Town II (resigned); Leicester City II (resigned); Watford II (resigned)
- Matches: 272
- Goals: 1,195 (4.39 per match)

A total of 17 teams contest the division, including 15 sides from previous season and two new teams.

Newly elected teams:

- Dartford
- Poole

Pos	Team	Pld	W	D	L	GF	GA	GR	Pts	Result
1	Brighton & Hove Albion II	32	21	6	5	86	47	1.830	48	
2	Peterborough & Fletton United	32	18	9	5	80	39	2.051	45	
3	Portsmouth II	32	19	6	7	95	65	1.462	44	Left league at end of season
4	Kettering Town	32	15	10	7	66	41	1.610	40	
5	Millwall II	32	16	5	11	67	56	1.196	37	
6	Bournemouth & Boscombe Athletic II	32	14	6	12	69	64	1.078	34	
7	Norwich City II	32	14	5	13	79	74	1.068	33	
8	Dartford	32	13	7	12	60	71	0.845	33	
9	Reading II	32	12	8	12	75	79	0.949	32	Left league at end of season
10	Luton Town II	32	10	11	11	75	70	1.071	31	Left league at end of season
11	Leicester City II	32	12	5	15	94	72	1.306	29	Left league at end of season
12	Watford II	32	10	8	14	74	84	0.881	28	Left league at end of season
13	Southampton II	32	10	6	16	57	77	0.740	26	
14	Poole	32	9	6	17	55	86	0.640	24	
15	Grays Thurrock United	32	10	3	19	49	66	0.742	23	
16	Guildford United	32	6	7	19	57	106	0.538	19	Changed name to Guildford City at end of season
17	Folkestone	32	7	4	21	57	98	0.582	18	

Rules for classification: The system of using goal average to separate two teams tied on points was used up until the 1976–77 season. The points system: 2 points for a win, 1 point for a draw and 0 points for losing.

== Western Division ==
Southern Football League Western Division
- Season: 1926–27
- Champions: Torquay United
- Promoted: Torquay United
- Relegated: none
- Matches: 182
- Goals: 757 (4.16 per match)

A total of 14 teams contest the division, including 13 sides from previous season and one new team.

Newly elected teams:

- Newport County II

Pos	Team	Pld	W	D	L	GF	GA	GR	Pts	Qualification
1	Torquay United	26	17	4	5	63	30	2.100	38	Elected to the Football League Third Division South
2	Bristol City II	26	14	10	2	77	37	2.081	38	
3	Plymouth Argyle II	26	15	4	7	56	38	1.474	34	
4	Ebbw Vale	26	14	2	10	67	45	1.489	30	
5	Bristol Rovers II	26	12	4	10	51	43	1.186	28	
6	Swindon Town II	26	11	5	10	60	57	1.053	27	
7	Barry	26	11	4	11	65	50	1.300	26	
8	Exeter City II	26	10	6	10	62	49	1.265	26	
9	Weymouth	26	12	2	12	48	65	0.738	26	
10	Newport County II	26	9	6	11	57	53	1.075	24	
11	Bath City	26	7	9	10	44	52	0.846	23	
12	Yeovil & Petters United	26	9	5	12	49	66	0.742	23	
13	Taunton United	26	4	4	18	36	83	0.434	12	Changed name to Taunton Town at end of season
14	Mid Rhondda United	26	2	5	19	22	89	0.247	9	

Rules for classification: The system of using goal average to separate two teams tied on points was used up until the 1976–77 season. The points system: 2 points for a win, 1 point for a draw and 0 points for losing.

== Football League election ==
Four Southern League clubs applied to join the Football League this season, entering the ballot alongside the bottom two from the Third Division South. Although Watford were re-elected, Aberdare Athletic received the same number of votes as Southern League Torquay United, leading to a second round, in which Torquay won more votes. Aberdare took Torquay's place in the Southern League the following season.

Aberdare's loss was controversial, as one ballot paper in the first round had been spoilt and Aberdare's secretary claimed that one of the scrutineers was 'an interested party'.

Club	League	First round votes	Second round votes
Watford	Football League Third Division South	44	
Torquay United	Southern League	21	26
Aberdare Athletic	Football League Third Division South	21	19
Kettering Town	Southern League	1	
Yeovil & Petters United	Southern League	1	
Ebbw Vale	Southern League	0	
