= Porth Athletic F.C. =

Former association football club in Wales

Porth Athletic
- Full name: Porth Athletic Association Football Club
- Nickname(s): the Bantams
- Founded: 1906
- Dissolved: 1925
- Ground: Caemawr Park
- League: Southern League; Welsh League

Porth Athletic F.C. was an association football club from Porth, Wales, which won the Welsh League in 1921–22.

== History ==
The first reference to the club is from 1906. It played at a local level until after the First World War, when the club took a more ambitious attitude, entering the Southern League and Welsh League in 1919, the Welsh Cup for the first time in 1920, and the FA Cup in 1921, and recruiting as manager Frederick G. B. Mortimer, formerly of Bristol City and Swansea Town. Mortimer was dismissed in acrimonious circumstances in October 1919; it emerged that he had been accused of stealing income tax payments when he worked as a tax collector. In 1920 the club recruited Billy Ball as player-manager from Swansea Town.

The club was incorporated in May 1921 in order to raise the funds to buy a new ground at Caermawr, and one of the chief investors was the Rhondda Tramways Company. The club's best season was 1921–22, the squad being made up of "a lot of cast-offs of the Swans [i.e. Swansea Town]", in which it won its only FA Cup tie, won through three rounds of the Welsh Cup for the only time, and won the Welsh League.

However, the success attracted other clubs to the Bantams' players, Harry Thomas moving as soon as the title was won and forward Alfred Hardy, who had scored 40 goals, moving to Barrow after the season end. After a winless season in the Southern League in 1922–23, the club went into abeyance. The Welsh League reduced to 16 clubs at the close of the season and Porth failed with its application for membership. The club's last recorded activity is hosting a fund-raising event in 1925 to clear its debts.

== Ground ==
The club originally played at the Tynycymmer Ground. In 1921 it moved to Caemawr Park. The highest crowd recorded there was "about 14,000" for a match against Ton Pentre on 19 September 1921.

== Notable players ==
- Charles Cotton, signed from Brentford in 1920
- Joe Hughes (goalkeeper), who impressed Bristol City in the Southern League so much that the Robins signed him in 1920.
- Harry Thomas, who left for Manchester United in 1922.
