= 1923–24 Southern Football League =

The 1923–24 season was the 26th in the history of the Southern League. The league was split into Eastern and Western Divisions. Peterborough & Fletton United won the Eastern Division and Yeovil & Petters United won the Western Division. Yeovil were declared Southern League champions after defeating Peterborough 3–1 in a championship play-off. No clubs applied to join the Football League this season, and no clubs left the league at the end of the season.

== Eastern Division ==
Southern Football League Eastern Division
- Season: 1923–24
- Champions: Peterborough & Fletton United
- Promoted: none
- Relegated: none
- Matches: 240
- Goals: 757 (3.15 per match)

A total of 16 teams contest the division (previously called the English section), including 10 sides from previous season and six new teams.

Newly elected teams:

- Peterborough & Fletton United
- Folkestone
- Kettering
- Bournemouth & Boscombe Athletic II (replacing their first team, which had been promoted to the Football League the previous season)
- Leicester City II
- Northampton Town II

Pos	Team	Pld	W	D	L	GF	GA	GR	Pts	Result
1	Peterborough & Fletton United	30	20	2	8	54	31	1.742	42	
2	Leicester City II	30	19	3	8	72	30	2.400	41	
3	Southampton II	30	18	5	7	60	36	1.667	41	
4	Millwall II	30	18	3	9	56	38	1.474	39	
5	Portsmouth II	30	16	2	12	66	37	1.784	34	
6	Brighton & Hove Albion II	30	13	7	10	55	42	1.310	33	
7	Norwich City II	30	13	6	11	46	34	1.353	32	
8	Folkestone	30	12	5	13	61	51	1.196	29	
9	Coventry City II	30	10	8	12	39	34	1.147	28	
10	Watford II	30	11	6	13	36	48	0.750	28	
11	Reading II	30	11	6	13	32	43	0.744	28	
12	Northampton Town II	30	9	10	11	32	47	0.681	28	
13	Luton Town II	30	10	7	13	40	49	0.816	27	
14	Guildford United	30	7	5	18	38	72	0.528	19	
15	Kettering	30	5	8	17	30	67	0.448	18	Changed name to Kettering Town at end of season
16	Bournemouth & Boscombe Athletic II	30	4	5	21	40	98	0.408	13	

Rules for classification: The system of using goal average to separate two teams tied on points was used up until the 1976–77 season. The points system: 2 points for a win, 1 point for a draw and 0 points for losing.

== Western Division ==
Southern Football League Western Division
- Season: 1923–24
- Champions: Yeovil & Petters United (1st title)
- Promoted: none
- Relegated: none
- Matches: 306
- Goals: 974 (3.18 per match)

A total of 18 teams contest the division (previously called the Welsh section), including 6 sides from previous season, 8 teams transferred from English section and four new teams.

Teams transferred from 1922–23 English section:

- Bath City
- Torquay United
- Yeovil & Petters United
- Bristol City II
- Bristol Rovers II
- Exeter City II
- Plymouth Argyle II
- Swindon Town II

Newly elected teams:

- Llanelly
- Weymouth - (newly elected from the Western League)
- Cardiff City II
- Newport County II

Pos	Team	Pld	W	D	L	GF	GA	GR	Pts	Qualification (Note: Number of goals for and/or against is inaccurate.)
1	Yeovil & Petters United	34	25	3	6	71	30	2.367	53	
2	Plymouth Argyle II	34	21	5	8	74	37	2.000	47	
3	Pontypridd	34	19	8	7	81	44	1.841	46	
4	Torquay United	34	19	7	8	59	25	2.360	45	
5	Bristol City II	34	17	9	8	63	39	1.615	43	
6	Swansea Town II	34	19	5	10	62	38	1.632	43	
7	Bristol Rovers II	34	17	6	11	69	43	1.605	40	
8	Cardiff City II	34	15	4	15	55	31	1.774	34	
9	Exeter City II	34	11	11	12	48	47	1.021	33	
10	Weymouth	34	15	3	16	48	60	0.800	33	
11	Llanelly	34	14	5	15	47	62	0.758	33	
12	Swindon Town II	34	11	6	17	36	60	0.600	28	
13	Bridgend Town	34	11	5	18	57	72	0.792	27	
14	Newport County II	34	10	7	17	57	78	0.731	27	
15	Ebbw Vale	34	8	8	18	38	62	0.613	24	
16	Bath City	34	6	9	19	32	71	0.451	21	
17	Barry	34	6	7	21	36	74	0.486	19	
18	Aberaman Athletic	34	6	4	24	41	87	0.471	16	

Rules for classification: The system of using goal average to separate two teams tied on points was used up until the 1976–77 season. The points system: 2 points for a win, 1 point for a draw and 0 points for losing.
