= Northfleet United F.C. =

Northfleet United Football Club
- Full name: Northfleet United Football Club
- Nicknames: The Fleet; The Cementers
- Founded: 1890
- Dissolved: 1946
- Ground: Stonebridge Road; Northfleet; Gravesham
Home colours	Away colours

Northfleet United Football Club was a football club based in Northfleet, Kent.

Around 1890 organised team football was being played in the town and in 1892 the Northfleet F.C. club was founded. It flourished for a few years in the mid-1890s until its demise in 1898. Several years later in 1903 Northfleet United F.C. was founded. In its playing existence (1903–1939) the United club achieved unrivalled success - they won more trophies than any other senior club competing in Kent-based competitions over that period: they were Kent League Champions on ten occasions, Kent League Cup winners on five occasions and Kent Senior Cup winners nine times. The club disappeared as an independent entity in 1946 after amalgamating with Gravesend United to form Gravesend and Northfleet F.C.

== History ==
A club named Northfleet Invicta were playing friendly matches at Portland Meadow in 1890 and although they continued after the formation of Northfleet F.C. in 1892, the latter club would become the pre-eminent team in the town. This club used a ground at the Six Bells, Perry Street playing challenge and friendly matches and adopted the red and white colours of the local cricket team (for whom some of the players were members). In 1893 the club relocated to a more centrally located ground at Collins' Meadow and the team's strength was augmented by amalgamation with local club Northfleet Phoenix and players joining from Northfleet Defiance and Britannia Star. A couple of seasons later, in the 1894–95 campaign, 'the Fleet' played 42 challenge and cup matches losing 6 and recording a goals record of 187 scored and 54 conceded - and won their first county level trophy, the Kent Junior Cup beating Chatham Reserves 2–0 in the final.

Following development, including levelling of the across-field sloping pitch and construction of a timber stand, Collins' Meadow was renamed as the Athletic Ground in the early part of the 1895–96 season. This coincided with the club entering the Kent League: they won the 1895–96 Division 1 Championship in this first season and thereby won the Kent Senior Cup (it was awarded to Kent League winners at this time). This success encouraged 'the Cementers' to move to a higher standard of football and into Division 1 of the Southern League for the 1896–97 campaign. That season the team reached the Fourth Qualifying round of the FA Cup competition, in which they were defeated 8–1 away at fellow Southern League team Millwall Athletic. The club also competed in the midweek Thames and Medway Combination at this time and in the 1897–98 season they finished fourth, one point adrift from the champions - they would have topped the table had one of the Northfleet players not struck a referee and caused a match against Dartford in which they were 3–0 to the good being abandoned and then being defeated in the replayed match.

Playing against more established teams with a larger support base 'the Cementers' struggled towards the foot of the table in their two seasons in the Southern League and had to play in the relegation test matches - they survived in the first season, 1896–97, owing to their play-off conquerors Freemantle withdrawing from the league. With higher costs than previously from employing higher standard professional players the club incurred financial losses and mounting debts. At the end of their second Southern League season of 1897–98, 'the Fleet' were again defeated in the Division 1 relegation test matches and rather than play Division 2 Southern League football the club decided to rejoin the Kent League for the 1898–99 season. But two months into the season in November 1898 Northfleet's weak financial position and indebtedness precipitated an amalgamation with (effectively an absorption by) neighbouring club Gravesend United. The Northfleet name was not incorporated into the title of the enlarged club, which continued to be known as simply Gravesend United and continued playing in their own team colours on their Overcliffe ground.

It was five years before a new senior club emerged with the establishment in 1903 of Northfleet United F.C., initially as an amateur club. The club could not be named simply as Northfleet as the Kent County Football Association continued to hold a suspension over that club name dating from its demise in 1898. The new team played on the old club's Athletic Ground and joined the West Kent League, with a reserve team playing in the Dartford and District League. In 1905 after two seasons at the Athletic Ground 'the Cementers' relocated their home ground to the newly constructed Stonebridge Road ground, on land acquired from the local cement company, where they completed their third and final West Kent League campaign. In 1906–07 Northfleet United upgraded their team and joined the Kent League: in their first season in this league 'the Fleet' attained the runners-up spot. Also in 1906–07 they matched their best FA Cup performance in reaching the Fourth Qualifying round (losing 6–1 at West Norwood) - having defeated Gravesend United via a replay in the previous round. There was success too for 'the Cementers' reserve team who twice headed the end of season West Kent League table: in 1907 (with 32 points from 15 wins and 2 draws over 19 matches); and again in 1908 (with 34 points from 16 wins and 2 draws from 20 matches).

The club followed that first Kent League season with three consecutive Kent League Championship titles in 1907–08, 1908–09 and 1909–10. In the latter two of these seasons 'the Fleet' again reached the Fourth Qualifying round of the FA Cup - losing out in replays on both occasions to leading Southern League Division 2 club Croydon Common. The 1909–10 season saw a triple success with not only the aforementioned Kent League crown but also 'the Cementers' were the midweek league Thames and Medway Combination champions and winners of the now knock-out competition Kent Senior Cup defeating Chatham in the final. The latter was an improvement over the previous season's Kent Senior Cup when the team were runners-up to Maidstone United.

In the two seasons prior to the suspension of matches caused by the Great War Northfleet United again both won and were runners-up in the Kent Senior Cup: in 1912–13 in the final they beat arch-rivals Gravesend United; in 1913–14 they were defeated in the final by Maidstone United. After the post-war resumption of league football in 1919–20 'the Fleet' were again Champions of the Kent League, but were defeated once more by league rivals Maidstone United in the Kent Senior Cup final. The next season, 1920–21, the team went one better in the Senior Cup competition defeating Ramsgate. That 1920–21 season saw the first of two consecutive seasons appearances by 'The Fleet' in the Kent Senior Shield final, they lost in both - the first to Margate and the second in 1921–22 to Maidstone United. The latter team also headed that season's Kent League table with Northfleet in runners-up spot. 'The Cementers' did though in 1921–22 progress their furthest to date in the FA Cup competition reaching the Fifth Qualifying round where they lost 3–1 in a replay at Football League Division 3 South club Gillingham.

In 1923 in an effort to balance expenditure with reduced income owing to falling attendances cutbacks were made to the team's playing strength - the manager position was cut and some amateur players recruited. The situation was alleviated with the commencement of a formal arrangement between Northfleet United and Football League Division 1 club Tottenham Hotspur: this saw the latter club's young players placed at Northfleet enabling 'the Cementers' to maintain a less costly but as it transpired, competitive and successful team in Kent football through the mid-1920s.

In 1923–24 Northfleet United were the first team to have their name engraved on the Kent League Cup, winning the inaugural competition with victory over Ashford Railway Works in the final. The following season they were runners-up in the Kent League. A year later 'the Fleet' were 1925–26 Kent League Division 1 champions scoring 172 goals over a 36 match season. In the 1926–27 campaign the team were Kent League Cup finalists, losing to the Chatham-based Royal Naval Depot. In the county cup competition, the Kent Senior Cup, for an unprecedented (and still record) five successive seasons between 1923–24 and 1927–28 Northfleet United won the trophy defeating in the finals Dartford, Sittingbourne, Folkestone, Sheppey United and again Sittingbourne. Additionally the team were successful in the Kent Senior Shield competition: they were joint winners with Gillingham of the 1923–24 edition after a drawn delayed final; and outright winners for three seasons, two were consecutive in 1924–25 and 1925–26 beating Chatham and Gillingham (the latter in a 7–5 goal-fest) and then in 1928–29 victors over Sheppey United. There was relative success too for 'the Cementers' in the FA Cup as Northfleet United appeared in the 'proper' rounds of the FA cup competition for seven straight seasons between 1925–26 and 1931–32. During this run the team achieved club best FA Cup performances appearing in the Second round in three seasons, succumbing on all three occasions to Football League Division 3 clubs: in 1926–27 losing 6–2 at Luton Town; in 1928–29 losing 5–1 on home turf to Charlton Athletic; and in 1929–30 losing 2–0 at Clapton Orient.

In the summer of 1927, following the contraction one season previously in the teams competing (and therefore matches) in the Kent League, 'the Fleet' decided to join the larger and higher standard Southern League, joining the Eastern Section. In the 1927–28 season - their first season back at this level since the ultimately ruinous foray by the old Northfleet club in 1896 - the team achieved a third-place position in the league table. Given the standard of the Southern League at the time this represents the highest point achieved by Northfleet United in league football. 'The Cementers' were unable to maintain this level in the table over the next two seasons. At the end of the 1929–30 season a significant number of teams deserted the Southern League for the London Combination League and Northfleet United reverted to the then expanded Kent League.

In 1931 the arrangement with Tottenham Hotspur was upgraded to full nursery team status and with the continuing availability of players from the Football League club 'the Cementers' won Kent based league and cup trophies in six of the next eight seasons.

United were three-time 'double' winners of the Kent League Division 1 Championship and Kent League Cup in 1931–32, 1934–35, and 1936–37 (beating Folkestone, Gillingham and Folkestone in the cup finals). Additionally, they were Kent League Division 1 Championship winners in 1935–36, matching the feat of the club from 27 years previously in completing a straight hat-trick as league toppers. In 1937–38 Northfleet United etched their name for the last time on two trophies: the Kent Senior Cup (for the ninth occasion), after beating Dover in the final; and jointly on the Kent League Cup (for the fifth time), following a delayed drawn final, with London Paper Mills. The club's best performance in the Kent Senior Shield during this period was a runners-up spot in the 1934–35 final losing to Dartford. The two seasons without trophies in this eight season run were 1932–33 and 1933–34: in the former season 'the Fleet' were both Kent League runners-up to Margate on goal average only and losing finalists in the Kent League Cup final to Tunbridge Wells Rangers; in the latter season the team finished a distant fourth in the league rankings and were both League Cup and Kent Senior Cup losing semi-finalists. Owing to the existence of the nursery arrangement between Northfleet United and Tottenham Hotspur from 1937 onwards 'the Fleet' were barred from entering the FA Cup competition.

The Last Hurrah for 'the Cementers' was winning a tenth Kent League Championship title in 1938–39 (becoming champions for the fourth occasion over 5 seasons). There was too a losing appearance against Dartford in the Kent Senior Shield final. In the nine Kent League seasons (since their return from the Southern League) between 1930–1931 and 1938–1939 the Northfleet United team scored at least 110 league goals each season, averaging 127 per season - a rate of 3.75 scored per game with 1.1 goals per game conceded. Although the 1939–40 Kent League season commenced it was suspended and cancelled within a month owing to the outbreak of the Second World War. The nursery team arrangement with Tottenham ceased too.

In early 1946 with the club in danger of folding there was the possibility of a reprieve as West Ham United considered adopting Northfleet United as a nursery team. This didn't materialise and the financially struggling Northfleet United club merged in 1946 with Gravesend United. In contrast to the earlier 1898 amalgamation between these same two organisations the name and existence of Northfleet was not erased. The new combined club were named Gravesend & Northfleet and the new team adopted both the colours of Northfleet United (red and white) and Northfleet's Stonebridge Road stadium as their home ground.

In 2007 the Gravesend & Northfleet club renamed itself as Ebbsfleet United.

In November 2015, to celebrate the 125th anniversary of its founding, a complete history of the club, entitled 'Set in Concrete', was published.

== Honours ==
NORTHFLEET F.C. (1892–1898)

- Kent League
  - Champions: 1895–96
- Kent Senior Cup
  - Awarded: 1895–96 (as Kent League Champions)
- Kent Junior Cup
  - Winners: 1894–95

NORTHFLEET UNITED F.C. (1903–1939)

- Kent League
  - Champions (10): 1907–08; 1908–09; 1909–10; 1919–20; 1925–26; 1931–32; 1934–35; 1935–36; 1936–37; 1938–39
  - Runners-up (4): 1906–07; 1921–22; 1924–25; 1932–33
- Thames & Medway Combination
  - Champions: 1909–10
- Kent League Cup
  - Winners (5): 1923–24; 1931–32; 1934–35; 1936–37; 1937–38 (Joint)
  - Runners-up (2): 1926–27; 1932–33
- Kent Senior Cup
  - Winners (9): 1909–10; 1912–13; 1920–21; 1923–24; 1924–25; 1925–26; 1926–27; 1927–28; 1937–38
  - Runners-up (3): 1908–09; 1913–14; 1919–20
- Kent Senior Shield (Gilbert Parker Shield):
  - Winners (4): 1923–24 (Joint); 1924–25; 1925–26; 1928–29
  - Runners-up (4): 1920–21; 1921–22; 1934–35; 1938–39
- Best Performances FA Cup:
  - Round 2 (3): 1926–27; 1928–29; 1929–30
  - Round 1 (5): 1925–26; 1927–28; 1930–31; 1931–32; 1933–34

Reserves

- West Kent League Champions: 1906–07; 1907–08

== Season playing records ==
=== Northfleet (1892–1898) ===
Season	Lge	Pld	W	D	L	GF	GA	Pts	Pos	FA Cup	Other*
1894–95										2Q	w:KJC
1895–96	Kent League Div 1	22	16	2	4	85	31	34	1/12	2Q	
1896–97	Southern League Div1	20	5	4	11	24	46	14	9/11	4Q	
1896–97	Thames & Medway C	10	5	1	4	23	24	11	3/6	4Q	
1897–98	Southern League Div1	22	4	3	15	29	60	11	11/12	1Q	
1897–98	Thames & Medway C	14	10	0	4	33	16	20	4/8	1Q	
1898–99	Kent League	Withdrew. Record expunged									

=== Northfleet United (1903–1939) ===
Season	Lge	Pld	W	D	L	GF	GA	Pts	Pos	FA Cup	Other*
1903–04	West Kent League	14	2	2	10	13	38	6	8/8	P	
1904–05	West Kent League	20	7	3	10	37	50	17	8/11	EP	
1905–06	West Kent League	16	7	2	7	25	26	16	?/9	–	
1906–07	Kent League	14	9	0	5	37	19	18	2/8	4Q	
1907–08	Kent League	16	14	1	1	54	13	29	1/9	P	
1908–09	Kent League	16	13	1	2	52	22	27	1/9	4Q	ru:KSC
1909–10	Kent League Div 1	22	17	2	3	74	31	36	1/12	4Q	w:KSC
1909–10	Thames & Medway C	11	8	2	1	26	12	18	1/7	4Q	w:KSC
1910–11	Kent League Div 1	26	7	4	15	38	64	18	13/14	P	
1911–12	Kent League Div 1	28	10	5	13	47	48	25	8/15	P	
1912–13	Kent League Div 1	28	14	5	9	58	55	33	4/15	1Q	w:KSC
1913–14	Kent League Div 1	30	17	5	8	63	49	37	4/16	1Q	–2pts; ru:KSC
1914–15										3Q	
1919–20	Kent League	24	19	3	2	70	22	41	1/13	3Q	ru:KSC
1920–21	Kent League Div 1	32	21	3	8	76	40	45	3/17	3Q	w:KSC; ru:KSS
1921–22	Kent League Div 1	28	18	6	4	78	36	42	2/15	5Q	ru:KSS
1922–23	Kent League Div 1	32	17	5	10	88	41	39	4/17	2Q	
1923–24	Kent League Div 1	30	15	5	10	61	35	35	4/16	Q1	w:KLC, KSC & KSS
1924–25	Kent League Div 1	34	29	1	4	114	25	59	2/18	P	w:KSC & KSS
1925–26	Kent League Div 1	36	29	3	4	172	48	61	1/19	R1	w:KSC & KSS
1926–27	Kent League Div 1	26	15	3	8	76	51	33	5/14	R2	ru:KLC; w:KSC
1927–28	Southern League: East	34	17	7	10	83	54	41	3/18	R1	w:KSC
1928–29	Southern League: East	36	17	4	15	87	65	38	9/19	R2	w:KSS
1929–30	Southern League: East	32	6	7	19	53	77	19	16/17	R2	
1930–31	Kent League Div 1	36	22	3	11	125	58	47	4/19	R1	
1931–32	Kent League Div 1	36	32	2	2	138	22	66	1/19	R1	w:KLC
1932–33	Kent League Div 1	34	28	1	5	126	50	57	2/18	4Q	ru:KLC
1933–34	Kent League Div 1	36	23	3	10	122	47	48	4/19	R1	
1934–35	Kent League Div 1	36	26	7	3	110	30	59	1/19	4Q	w:KLC; ru:KSS
1935–36	Kent League	36	26	5	5	158	41	57	1/19	4Q	
1936–37	Kent League	32	25	2	5	128	29	52	1/17	4Q	w:KLC
1937–38	Kent League Div 1	32	23	5	4	116	29	51	3/17	–	w:KLC & KSC
1938–39	Kent League Div 1	28	20	4	4	125	38	44	1/15	–	ru:KSS

Key

League Record

- Pld = Played
- W = Games won
- D = Games drawn
- L = Games lost
- GF = Goals for
- GA = Goals against
- Pts = Points
- Pos = Final position/rank

FA Cup

- 1Q = First qualifying round
- 2Q = Second qualifying round
- 3Q = Third qualifying round
- 4Q = Fourth qualifying round
- 5Q = Fifth qualifying round
- R1 = First round proper
- R2 = Second round proper

Other

- 'KJC=Kent Junior Cup
- 'KSC=Kent Senior Cup
- 'KSS=Kent Senior Shield
- 'KLC=Kent League Cup
- w = winner
- ru = runner-up
- sf = semi-finalist

See also section key to 'other'

== Former players ==
1. Players that have played/managed in the Football League or any foreign equivalent to this level (i.e. fully professional league).
2. Players with full international caps.
3. Players that hold a club record or have captained the club.

- (England) Charles Alton
- (England) Ron Burgess
- (England) Tommy Cook
- (England) Ted Ditchburn
- (England) Arthur Hitchins
- (England) Sidney Mulford
- (England) Bill Nicholson
