= 1928–29 Southern Football League =

The 1928–29 season was the thirty-first in the history of the Southern League. The league consisted of Eastern and Western Divisions. Kettering Town won the Eastern Division and Plymouth Argyle reserves won the Western Division. Plymouth reserves were declared Southern League champions after winning a championship play-off at Kettering 4-2.

Three clubs from the Southern League applied to join the Football League, although none were successful. Two clubs (both from the Eastern Division) left the league at the end of the season.

== Eastern Division ==
Southern Football League Eastern Division
- Season: 1928–29
- Champions: Kettering Town
- Promoted: none
- Relegated: Gillingham II (resigned); Chatham Town (resigned)
- Matches: 342
- Goals: 1,365 (3.99 per match)

A total of 19 teams contest the division, including 18 sides from previous season and one new team.

Newly elected team:

- Thames Association

Pos	Team	Pld	W	D	L	GF	GA	GR	Pts	Result
1	Kettering Town	36	24	4	8	96	46	2.087	52	
2	Peterborough & Fletton United	36	21	5	10	86	44	1.955	47	
3	Brighton & Hove Albion II	36	19	9	8	91	56	1.625	47	
4	Millwall II	36	21	4	11	90	67	1.343	46	
5	Bournemouth & Boscombe Athletic II	36	20	5	11	82	58	1.414	45	
6	Aldershot Town	36	18	5	13	68	52	1.308	41	
7	Sheppey United	36	17	7	12	58	58	1.000	41	
8	Folkestone	36	17	6	13	83	80	1.038	40	
9	Northfleet United	36	17	4	15	87	65	1.338	38	
10	Gillingham II	36	15	8	13	68	70	0.971	38	Left league at end of season
11	Guildford City	36	13	11	12	85	78	1.090	37	
12	Southampton II	36	14	6	16	86	79	1.089	34	
13	Poole	36	13	8	15	62	66	0.939	34	
14	Thames Association	36	13	5	18	67	74	0.905	31	
15	Dartford	36	10	6	20	55	106	0.519	26	
16	Chatham Town	36	8	8	20	47	81	0.580	24	Left league at end of season
17	Sittingbourne	36	11	1	24	59	98	0.602	23	
18	Norwich City II	36	8	6	22	48	96	0.500	22	
19	Grays Thurrock United	36	6	6	24	47	91	0.516	18	

Rules for classification: The system of using goal average to separate two teams tied on points was used until the 1976-77 season. The points system: 2 points for a win, 1 point for a draw and 0 points for losing.

== Western Division ==
Southern Football League Western Division
- Season: 1928–29
- Champions: Plymouth Argyle II (3rd title)
- Promoted: none
- Relegated: none
- Matches: 182
- Goals: 799 (4.39 per match)

A total of 14 teams contest the division, including 13 sides from previous season and one new team.

Newly elected team:

- Lovells Athletic

Pos	Team	Pld	W	D	L	GF	GA	GR	Pts
1	Plymouth Argyle II	26	15	6	5	69	27	2.556	36
2	Newport County II	26	15	2	9	64	58	1.103	32
3	Bristol Rovers II	26	14	3	9	54	45	1.200	31
4	Bristol City II	26	14	2	10	70	46	1.522	30
5	Torquay United II	26	13	4	9	52	42	1.238	30
6	Bath City	26	13	4	9	61	59	1.034	30
7	Exeter City II	26	11	6	9	69	53	1.302	28
8	Lovells Athletic	26	11	6	9	54	48	1.125	28
9	Swindon Town II	26	11	5	10	68	74	0.919	27
10	Yeovil & Petters United	26	11	2	13	49	57	0.860	24
11	Taunton Town	26	9	5	12	58	66	0.879	23
12	Ebbw Vale	26	9	5	12	56	66	0.848	23
13	Barry	26	6	3	17	38	66	0.576	15
14	Merthyr Town II	26	3	1	22	37	92	0.402	7

Rules for classification: The system of using goal average to separate two teams tied on points was used until the 1976-77 season. The points system: 2 points for a win, 1 point for a draw and 0 points for losing.

== Football League election ==
Three Southern League clubs, Aldershot Town, Thames Association and Kettering Town, applied to join the Football League. However, both League clubs were re-elected.

Club	League	Votes
Exeter City	Football League	42
Gillingham	Football League	35
Argonauts	None	6
Aldershot Town	Southern League	5
Thames Association	Southern League	1
Kettering Town	Southern League	1
Llanelly	Welsh National League (South)	0
