= 1922–23 Southern Football League =

The 1922–23 season was the 25th in the history of the Southern League. The league was split into two sections for a third season in a row, one for English clubs and one for Welsh clubs. Bristol City reserves won the English section, whilst Ebbw Vale won the Welsh section. Ebbw Vale were declared Southern League champions after beating Bristol City reserves 2–1 in a championship play-off. Boscombe, Pontypridd and Torquay United were the only Southern League clubs to apply for election to the Football League, with Boscombe being successful. The club was renamed Bournemouth & Boscombe Athletic the following year.

Following to the mid-season resignation of four clubs in the Welsh section due to financial problems and Porth Athletic leaving the league at the end of the season, the following season saw the English section renamed the Eastern Division and the Welsh section renamed the Western Division, with eight clubs transferring from the English section to the Western section.

== English section ==
Southern Football League English Section
- Season: 1922–23
- Champions: Bristol City II
- Promoted: Boscombe
- Relegated: Southend United II (resigned)
- Matches: 380
- Goals: 1,228 (3.23 per match)

A total of 20 clubs contest the division, including 17 sides from previous season and three new clubs.

Newly elected clubs:

- Torquay United (from the Western League)
- Yeovil & Petters United (from the Western League, although they continued to play in the Western League as well until World War II)
- Coventry City II (from the Birmingham & District League)

| Pos | Team | Pld | W | D | L | GF | GA | GR | Pts | Qualification |
|---|---|---|---|---|---|---|---|---|---|---|
| 1 | Bristol City II | 38 | 24 | 5 | 9 | 84 | 39 | 2.154 | 53 | Transferred to Western Division |
| 2 | Boscombe | 38 | 22 | 7 | 9 | 67 | 34 | 1.971 | 51 | Elected to the Football League Third Division South |
| 3 | Portsmouth II | 38 | 23 | 3 | 12 | 93 | 51 | 1.824 | 49 | Transferred to Eastern Division |
| 4 | Bristol Rovers II | 38 | 20 | 8 | 10 | 59 | 41 | 1.439 | 48 | Transferred to Western Division |
| 5 | Plymouth Argyle II | 38 | 20 | 7 | 11 | 74 | 41 | 1.805 | 47 | Transferred to Western Division |
| 6 | Torquay United | 38 | 18 | 8 | 12 | 63 | 38 | 1.658 | 44 | Transferred to Western Division |
| 7 | Brighton & Hove Albion II | 38 | 20 | 3 | 15 | 95 | 60 | 1.583 | 43 | Transferred to Eastern Division |
| 8 | Luton Town II | 38 | 16 | 11 | 11 | 67 | 56 | 1.196 | 43 | Transferred to Eastern Division |
| 9 | Southend United II | 38 | 18 | 6 | 14 | 69 | 68 | 1.015 | 42 | Left league at end of season |
| 10 | Southampton II | 38 | 18 | 5 | 15 | 65 | 54 | 1.204 | 41 | Transferred to Eastern Division |
| 11 | Millwall II | 38 | 15 | 10 | 13 | 61 | 55 | 1.109 | 40 | Transferred to Eastern Division |
| 12 | Coventry City II | 38 | 15 | 8 | 15 | 56 | 61 | 0.918 | 38 | Transferred to Eastern Division |
| 13 | Guildford United | 38 | 15 | 7 | 16 | 65 | 59 | 1.102 | 37 | Transferred to Eastern Division |
| 14 | Swindon Town II | 38 | 13 | 6 | 19 | 54 | 73 | 0.740 | 32 | Transferred to Western Division |
| 15 | Bath City | 38 | 10 | 8 | 20 | 44 | 71 | 0.620 | 28 | Transferred to Western Division |
| 16 | Watford II | 38 | 11 | 6 | 21 | 34 | 79 | 0.430 | 28 | Transferred to Eastern Division |
| 17 | Yeovil & Petters United | 38 | 10 | 6 | 22 | 56 | 104 | 0.538 | 26 | Transferred to Western Division |
| 18 | Norwich City II | 38 | 9 | 7 | 22 | 42 | 68 | 0.618 | 25 | Transferred to Eastern Division |
| 19 | Exeter City II | 38 | 10 | 5 | 23 | 43 | 81 | 0.531 | 25 | Transferred to Western Division |
| 20 | Reading II | 38 | 7 | 6 | 25 | 37 | 95 | 0.389 | 20 | Transferred to Eastern Division |

Rules for classification: The system of using goal average to separate two clubs tied on points was used up until the 1976–77 season. The points system: 2 points for a win, 1 point for a draw and 0 points for losing.

== Welsh section ==
Southern Football League Welsh Section
- Season: 1922–23
- Champions: Ebbw Vale (1st title)
- Promoted: none
- Relegated: Porth Athletic (resigned); Ton Pentre (resigned); Mardy (resigned); Caerphilly (resigned); Abertillery (resigned)
- Matches: 42
- Goals: 133 (3.17 per match)

A total of 11 clubs contest the division, including nine sides from previous season and two new clubs.

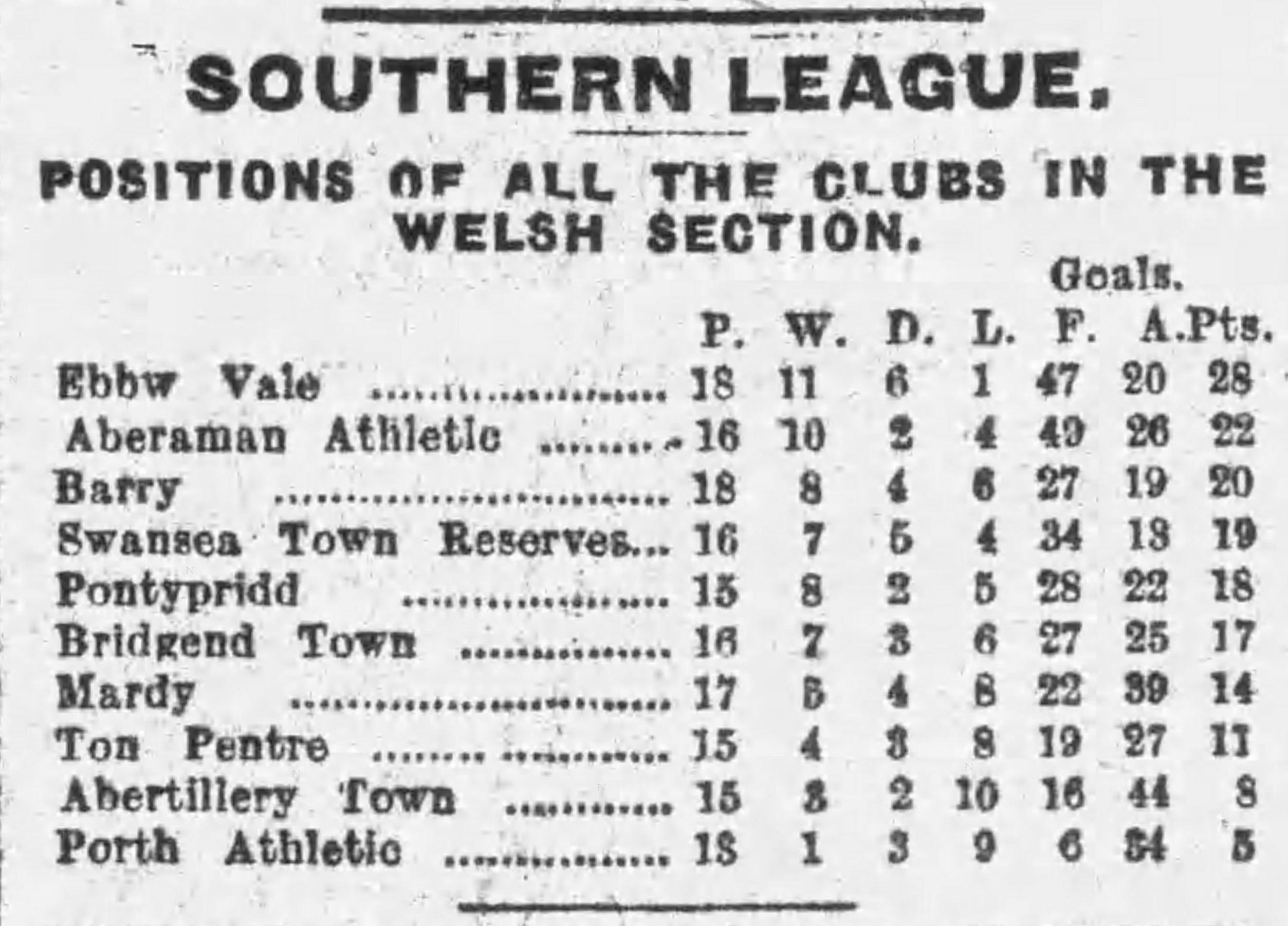
The table from the 17 April 1923 edition of the South Wales Argus, before the expunging of the records of four clubs

Newly elected clubs:

- Bridgend Town
- Caerphilly

| Pos | Team | Pld | W | D | L | GF | GA | GR | Pts | Result |
|---|---|---|---|---|---|---|---|---|---|---|
| 1 | Ebbw Vale | 12 | 6 | 5 | 1 | 22 | 15 | 1.467 | 17 | Transferred to Western Division |
| 2 | Aberaman Athletic | 12 | 7 | 2 | 3 | 30 | 19 | 1.579 | 16 | Transferred to Western Division |
| 3 | Swansea Town II | 12 | 6 | 2 | 4 | 25 | 14 | 1.786 | 14 | Transferred to Western Division |
| 4 | Pontypridd | 12 | 6 | 2 | 4 | 18 | 18 | 1.000 | 14 | Transferred to Western Division |
| 5 | Barry | 12 | 4 | 3 | 5 | 15 | 11 | 1.364 | 11 | Transferred to Western Division |
| 6 | Bridgend Town | 12 | 4 | 2 | 6 | 15 | 21 | 0.714 | 10 | Transferred to Western Division |
| 7 | Porth Athletic | 12 | 0 | 2 | 10 | 8 | 35 | 0.229 | 2 | Left league at end of season |
| 8 | Abertillery | 0 | 0 | 0 | 0 | 0 | 0 | — | 0 | Did not complete fixtures, records expunged |
| 9 | Caerphilly | 0 | 0 | 0 | 0 | 0 | 0 | — | 0 | Did not complete fixtures, records expunged |
| 10 | Mardy | 0 | 0 | 0 | 0 | 0 | 0 | — | 0 | Did not complete fixtures, records expunged |
| 11 | Ton Pentre | 0 | 0 | 0 | 0 | 0 | 0 | — | 0 | Did not complete fixtures, records expunged |

Rules for classification: The system of using goal average to separate two clubs tied on points was used up until the 1976–77 season. The points system: 2 points for a win, 1 point for a draw and 0 points for losing.

== Football League election ==
In addition to the two clubs finishing bottom of Football League Third Division South, four non-League clubs joined the election process, of which three were from the Southern League. Boscombe from the English section were successful and joined the League the following season.

| Club | League | Votes |
|---|---|---|
| Aberdare Athletic | Football League Third Division South | 45 |
| Newport County | Football League Third Division South | 45 |
| Boscombe | Southern League | 28 |
| Llanelly | Welsh National League (South) | 9 |
| Pontypridd | Southern League | 8 |
| Torquay United | Southern League | 0 |
