= 1924–25 Southern Football League =

The 1924–25 season was the 27th in the history of the Southern League. As in the previous season, the league was split into Eastern and Western Divisions. Southampton II won the Eastern Division and Swansea Town II won the Western Division. Southampton were declared Southern League champions after defeating Swansea 2–1 in a championship play-off.

Mid Rhondda United, who finished fifth in the Western Division, were the only club to apply to join the Football League, but were unsuccessful in the vote. Seven clubs left the league at the end of the season.

== Eastern Division ==
Southern Football League Eastern Division
- Season: 1924–25
- Champions: Southampton II (1 title)
- Promoted: none
- Relegated: Northampton Town II (resigned)
- Matches: 272
- Goals: 915 (3.36 per match)

A total of 16 teams contest the division, including 15 sides from previous season and one new team.

Newly elected teams:

- Nuneaton Town

Pos	Team	Pld	W	D	L	GF	GA	GR	Pts	Result
1	Southampton II	32	17	10	5	65	30	2.167	44	
2	Kettering Town	32	17	6	9	67	39	1.718	40	
3	Brighton & Hove Albion II	32	15	10	7	68	42	1.619	40	
4	Millwall II	32	15	10	7	65	48	1.354	40	
5	Peterborough & Fletton United	32	15	9	8	56	29	1.931	39	
6	Bournemouth & Boscombe Athletic II	32	15	9	8	66	48	1.375	39	
7	Leicester City II	32	15	7	10	61	45	1.356	37	
8	Portsmouth II	32	15	7	10	51	40	1.275	37	
9	Folkestone	32	13	11	8	55	46	1.196	37	
10	Norwich City II	32	13	8	11	65	58	1.121	34	
11	Coventry City II	32	12	9	11	51	41	1.244	33	
12	Luton Town II	32	15	2	15	48	63	0.762	32	
13	Northampton Town II	32	10	5	17	38	59	0.644	25	Left league at end of season
14	Watford II	32	7	7	18	44	71	0.620	21	
15	Nuneaton Town	32	8	2	22	37	62	0.597	18	
16	Reading II	32	8	1	23	38	87	0.437	17	
17	Guildford United	32	4	3	25	40	107	0.374	11	

Rules for classification: The system of using goal average to separate two teams tied on points was used until the 1976–77 season. The points system: 2 points for a win, 1 point for a draw and 0 points for losing.

== Western Division ==
Southern Football League Western Division
- Season: 1924–25
- Champions: Swansea Town II
- Promoted: none
- Relegated: Swansea Town II (resigned); Bridgend Town (resigned); Cardiff City II (resigned); Newport County II (resigned); Llanelly (resigned); Aberaman Athletic (resigned)
- Matches: 380
- Goals: 1,169 (3.08 per match)

A total of 20 teams contest the division, including 18 sides from previous season and two new teams.

Newly elected teams:

- Mid Rhondda United
- Taunton United

Pos	Team	Pld	W	D	L	GF	GA	GR	Pts	Result
1	Swansea Town II	38	25	4	9	73	26	2.808	54	Left league at end of season
2	Plymouth Argyle II	38	22	10	6	97	35	2.771	54	
3	Pontypridd	38	24	4	10	81	39	2.077	52	
4	Bridgend Town	38	20	11	7	74	52	1.423	51	Left league at end of season
5	Mid Rhondda United	38	21	6	11	79	48	1.646	48	
6	Weymouth	38	21	4	13	77	50	1.540	46	
7	Cardiff City II	38	18	6	14	56	44	1.273	42	Left league at end of season
8	Newport County II	38	17	8	13	71	60	1.183	42	Left league at end of season
9	Swindon Town II	38	17	8	13	48	46	1.043	42	
10	Bristol City II	38	18	5	15	51	43	1.186	41	
11	Yeovil & Petters United	38	15	10	13	49	50	0.980	40	
12	Exeter City II	38	16	6	16	78	55	1.418	38	
13	Taunton United	38	15	6	17	55	51	1.078	36	
14	Bristol Rovers II	38	13	6	19	45	50	0.900	32	
15	Torquay United	38	9	11	18	41	73	0.562	29	
16	Llanelly	38	6	12	20	49	94	0.521	24	Left league at end of season
17	Ebbw Vale	38	9	6	23	40	91	0.440	24	
18	Bath City	38	8	8	22	28	85	0.329	24	
19	Barry	38	8	6	24	38	82	0.463	22	
20	Aberaman Athletic	38	6	7	25	39	95	0.411	19	Left league at end of season

Rules for classification: The system of using goal average to separate two teams tied on points was used until the 1976–77 season. The points system: 2 points for a win, 1 point for a draw and 0 points for losing.

== Football League election ==
Mid-Rhondda United were the only non-League club to enter the elections for a place in the Football League Third Division South. However, they received no votes and both League clubs were re-elected.

Club	League	Votes
Brentford	Football League Third Division South	44
Merthyr Town	Football League Third Division South	44
Mid-Rhondda United	Southern League	0
