= Joe Hughes (footballer) =

Welsh football player

Personal information
- Full name: Joseph "Joe" Hughes
- Date of birth: 1898
- Place of birth: Tylorstown, Wales
- Position: Goalkeeper

Senior career*
Years	Team	Apps	(Gls)
1919–1921	Porth Athletic		
1921	Bristol City	3	(0)
1921–1923	Grimsby Town	31	(0)
- * Club domestic league appearances and goals

Joseph Hughes (born 1898) was a Welsh professional footballer who played as a goalkeeper.
