= Arthur Hitchins =

English professional footballer (1912–1975)

Personal information
- Full name: Arthur William Hitchins
- Date of birth: 1 December 1912
- Place of birth: Devonport, Plymouth, England
- Date of death: 10 October 1975 (aged 62)
- Place of death: Barnet, England
- Height: 5 ft 10 in (1.78 m)
- Position: Centre half

Senior career*
Years	Team	Apps	(Gls)
1932–1934	Walthamstow Avenue		
1934	Lea Bridge Gasworks		
1935–1942	Tottenham Hotspur	37	(1)
1935–1936	→ Northfleet United (loan)		
- * Club domestic league appearances and goals

Arthur William Hitchins (1 December 1912 – 10 October 1975) was an English professional footballer who played as a defender. Throughout his career, Hitchins played for Walthamstow Avenue, Lea Bridge Gasworks, Tottenham Hotspur and Northfleet United.

== Early life ==
Arthur William Hitchins was born on 1 December 1912 in Devonport, Plymouth to Frederick and Rose Hitchins. Moving to Walthamstow at an early age, Hitchins grew up in a large family and was one of nine children.

== Career ==
Hitchins began his career at local amateur side Walthamstow Avenue in 1932 at the age of 18. During this time, he was part of a winning side that won two consecutive Athenian League titles in 1933 and 1934, one Essex Senior Cup and one London Charity Cup. Hitchins also represented the Essex County side in this time.

In the early months of 1934, Hitchins departed Green Pond Road and transferred to nearby amateur London side Lea Bridge Gasworks, where he was immediately appointed as the club captain. Hitchins swiftly achieved success with his new club as he led his team to winning the Tottenham Charity Cup and Division Two East of the Spartan League.

Hitchins' performances and success gained the attention of First Division side Tottenham Hotspur and was offered a trial on 1 December 1934 (his 22nd birthday). Following a successful trial, Hitchins signed as an amateur on 17 December 2024. He made his debut for "The Lilywhites" on Christmas Day in a 7–1 home win against Swansea Town in the London Combination. Hitchins signed professional forms with the club on 14 January 1935.

After spending the rest of the season with the reserves, Hitchins was sent out on loan to Tottenham's nursery side Northfleet United for a year. In this time, Hitchins was coached by Jack Coxford where he played primarily as a half back, helping his team become champions of the Kent League.

Upon returning from his loan, Hitchins made his professional debut for Tottenham on 23 October 1937 in a 3–2 Second Division home win versus Plymouth Argyle. Hitchins gradually became an established member of the first team and displaced Albert Page in the starting lineup. Hitchins scored his first and only ever professional goal on 11 March 1939 in a 2–3 loss against Manchester City in the Second Division. A consistent member of the team during war-time football, Hitchins was forced to retire from playing in 1942 due to a shoulder injury and a subsequent illness. After his playing days were over, Hitchins became a scout for his former club Tottenham Hotspur.

== Legacy ==
On 26 October 2023, Tottenham Hotspur honored all of their former players by assigning them commemorative legacy numbers. Hitchins was assigned legacy number 351 in recognition of his contributions to the club.

== Honours ==
Walthamstow Avenue

- Athenian League: 1932–33, 1933–34
- Essex Senior Cup: 1932–33
- London Charity Cup: 1933–34

Lea Bridge Gasworks

- Spartan League Division Two East: 1934–35
- Tottenham Charity Cup: 1934–35

Northfleet United

- Kent League: 1935–36
