= 1927–28 Southern Football League =

The 1927–28 season was the 30th in the history of the Southern League. The league consisted of Eastern and Western Divisions. Kettering Town won the Eastern Division and Bristol City reserves won the Western Division. Kettering were declared Southern League champions after defeating Bristol City reserves 5–0 in a championship play-off.

Two clubs from the Southern League applied to join the Football League, although neither was successful. Three clubs (all from the Western Division) left the league at the end of the season.

== Eastern Division ==
Southern Football League Eastern Division
- Season: 1927–28
- Champions: Kettering Town (1st title)
- Promoted: none
- Relegated: none
- Matches: 306
- Goals: 1,237 (4.04 per match)

A total of 18 teams contest the division, including 12 sides from previous season and six new teams.

Newly elected teams:

- Chatham Town - returned to the league after the resignation in 1921
- Northfleet United - returned to the league after the resignation in 1898
- Sheppey United - returned to the league after the resignation in 1901
- Aldershot Town
- Sittingbourne
- Gillingham II - returned to the league after the resignation in 1922

Pos	Team	Pld	W	D	L	GF	GA	GR	Pts
1	Kettering Town	34	23	6	5	90	39	2.308	52
2	Peterborough & Fletton United	34	21	3	10	73	43	1.698	45
3	Northfleet United	34	17	7	10	83	54	1.537	41
4	Brighton & Hove Albion II	34	20	0	14	90	63	1.429	40
5	Norwich City II	34	17	6	11	69	69	1.000	40
6	Southampton II	34	16	7	11	92	70	1.314	39
7	Aldershot Town	34	17	5	12	85	66	1.288	39
8	Sittingbourne	34	16	5	13	64	70	0.914	37
9	Millwall II	34	15	6	13	66	59	1.119	36
10	Poole	34	15	5	14	69	84	0.821	35
11	Folkestone	34	12	6	16	71	91	0.780	30
12	Guildford City	34	12	5	17	65	89	0.730	29
13	Dartford	34	12	4	18	46	49	0.939	28
14	Gillingham II	34	10	7	17	72	84	0.857	27
15	Sheppey United	34	11	3	20	57	87	0.655	25
16	Chatham Town	34	10	4	20	49	70	0.700	24
17	Grays Thurrock United	34	10	3	21	48	88	0.545	23
18	Bournemouth & Boscombe Athletic II	34	9	4	21	48	62	0.774	22

Rules for classification: The system of using goal average to separate two teams tied on points was used until the 1976–77 season. The points system: 2 points for a win, 1 point for a draw and 0 points for losing.

== Western Division ==
Southern Football League Western Division
- Season: 1927–28
- Champions: Bristol City II
- Promoted: none
- Relegated: Aberdare & Aberaman Athletic (resigned); Weymouth (resigned); Mid Rhondda United (resigned)
- Matches: 240
- Goals: 1,095 (4.56 per match)

A total of 16 teams contest the division, including 13 sides from previous season and three new teams.

Team relegated from 1926–27 Football League

- Aberdare & Aberaman Athletic - relegated from the Football League and renamed

Newly elected teams:

- Merthyr Town II
- Torquay United II - replacing their first team, who had been promoted to the Football League the previous season

Pos	Team	Pld	W	D	L	GF	GA	GR	Pts	Result
1	Bristol City II	30	20	3	7	95	51	1.863	43	
2	Exeter City II	30	18	4	8	104	56	1.857	40	
3	Bristol Rovers II	30	16	3	11	80	64	1.250	35	
4	Plymouth Argyle II	30	16	2	12	88	53	1.660	34	
5	Newport County II	30	13	8	9	99	70	1.414	34	
6	Ebbw Vale	30	15	3	12	67	74	0.905	33	
7	Swindon Town II	30	13	4	13	80	74	1.081	30	
8	Aberdare & Aberaman Athletic	30	12	6	12	62	68	0.912	30	Left league at end of season
9	Yeovil & Petters United	30	11	7	12	64	57	1.123	29	
10	Torquay United II	30	11	6	13	51	67	0.761	28	
11	Bath City	30	12	3	15	64	68	0.941	27	
12	Taunton Town	30	11	5	14	60	65	0.923	27	
13	Weymouth	30	10	6	14	50	83	0.602	26	Left league at end of season
14	Merthyr Town II	30	9	4	17	50	77	0.649	22	
15	Barry	30	8	6	16	45	87	0.517	22	
16	Mid Rhondda United	30	7	6	17	36	81	0.444	20	Left league at end of season

Rules for classification: The system of using goal average to separate two teams tied on points was used until the 1976–77 season. The points system: 2 points for a win, 1 point for a draw and 0 points for losing.

== Football League election ==
Two Southern League clubs, Kettering Town and Peterborough & Fletton United, applied to join the Football League. However, both League clubs were re-elected, with Argonauts, a new amateur club who had never played a match winning more votes than either Southern League club.

Club	League	Votes
Merthyr Town	Football League Third Division South	47
Torquay United	Football League Third Division South	42
Argonauts	None	16
Kettering Town	Southern League	3
Peterborough & Fletton United	Southern League	2
