= 1930–31 Southern Football League =

The 1930–31 season was the 33rd in the history of the Southern League. The league consisted of Eastern and Western Divisions. Dartford won the Eastern Division on goal average (had goal difference been used, Aldershot Town would have been champions) and Exeter City reserves won the Western Division. Dartford were declared Southern League champions after winning a championship play-off 7–2.

Two clubs from the Southern League applied to join the Football League, although neither were successful.

== Eastern Division ==
Southern Football League Eastern Division
- Season: 1930–31
- Champions: Dartford (1st title)
- Promoted: none
- Relegated: Thames II (resigned)
- Matches: 72
- Goals: 346 (4.81 per match)

A total of 9 teams contest the division, including 8 sides from previous season and one new team.

Newly elected team:

- Thames II - replaced its first team (which was elected to the Football League the previous year).

Pos	Team	Pld	W	D	L	GF	GA	GR	Pts	Result
1	Dartford	16	9	5	2	39	18	2.167	23	
2	Aldershot Town	16	10	3	3	50	28	1.786	23	
3	Norwich City II	16	9	1	6	47	38	1.237	19	
4	Peterborough & Fletton United	16	6	5	5	35	29	1.207	17	
5	Thames II	16	7	2	7	38	31	1.226	16	Left league at end of season
6	Millwall II	16	7	0	9	47	40	1.175	14	
7	Folkestone	16	4	3	9	31	46	0.674	11	
8	Guildford City	16	5	1	10	28	53	0.528	11	
9	Sheppey United	16	4	2	10	31	63	0.492	10	

Rules for classification: The system of using goal average to separate two teams tied on points was used up until the 1976–77 season. The points system: 2 points for a win, 1 point for a draw and 0 points for losing.

== Western Division ==
Southern Football League Western Division
- Season: 1930–31
- Champions: Exeter City II
- Promoted: none
- Relegated: Newport County II (resigned)
- Matches: 132
- Goals: 600 (4.55 per match)

A total of 12 teams contest the division, including 11 sides from previous season and one new team.

Team relegated from 1929–30 Football League:

- Merthyr Town

Pos	Team	Pld	W	D	L	GF	GA	GR	Pts	Result
1	Exeter City II	22	15	2	5	59	28	2.107	32	
2	Llanelly	22	10	8	4	72	39	1.846	28	
3	Merthyr Town	22	12	3	7	62	49	1.265	27	
4	Plymouth Argyle II	22	12	2	8	55	34	1.618	26	
5	Bath City	22	10	6	6	47	39	1.205	26	
6	Torquay United II	22	9	5	8	66	49	1.347	23	
7	Swindon Town II	22	7	7	8	48	52	0.923	21	
8	Bristol Rovers II	22	7	6	9	58	64	0.906	20	
9	Barry	22	7	5	10	29	39	0.744	19	
10	Taunton Town	22	5	7	10	36	62	0.581	17	
11	Newport County II	22	6	2	14	36	66	0.545	14	Replaced by first team at end of season
12	Ebbw Vale	22	5	1	16	32	79	0.405	11	

Rules for classification: The system of using goal average to separate two teams tied on points was used up until the 1976–77 season. The points system: 2 points for a win, 1 point for a draw and 0 points for losing.

== Football League election ==
Two Southern League clubs, Aldershot and Merthyr Town, applied to join the Football League, with Merthyr applying to join both Division Three North and Division Three South.

=== Third Division North ===
Club	League	First round votes	Second round votes
Rochdale	Football League	40	
Chester	Cheshire League	27	28
Nelson	Football League	27	20
Manchester Central	Lancashire Combination	4	
Merthyr Town	Southern League	0	

=== Third Division South ===
Club	League	Votes
Norwich City	Football League	38
Mansfield Town	Midland League	25
Newport County	Football League	19
Aldershot Town	Southern League	14
Merthyr Town	Southern League	2
