= Thames A.F.C. =

Defunct association football club in London, England

Thames AFC
- Full name: Thames Association Football Club
- Short name: Thames
- Founded: 1928
- Dissolved: 1932
- Ground: West Ham Stadium, Custom House, London
- Capacity: 120,000
- Chairman: Louis Dane
Home colours

Thames A.F.C. were an English football club from Custom House, east London, which played in the Football League between 1930 and 1932.

== Name ==
The club was founded under the name Custom House Athletic, but, to avoid confusion with the amateur Custom House F.C., changed its name to Thames Association before playing a match. Unlike other AFCs (e.g. Sunderland A.F.C.), the word Association was initially presented as part of the club name – i.e. Thames Association or Thames Association FC. The "Association" was abbreviated upon joining the Football League, giving the team the more regular name of Thames AFC.

== History ==
They were founded in 1928, in a similar manner to Sheffield United, Liverpool, New Brighton Tower and nearby Chelsea: to play on a ground which had no football club in residence. In Thames' case, they were formed by a group of businessmen who had built the West Ham Stadium, with a capacity of 120,000, in the Custom House area of Essex (now part of the London Borough of Newham in Greater London); the stadium was primarily used for greyhound and speedway racing which took place during the week, leaving Saturdays free. The directors of the stadium decided to form a professional football club to play on Saturdays, to bring in additional revenue to the stadium.

The club began playing in the Southern League Eastern Division, and finished 14th in their first season and third in the season after that (1929–30). This was enough for them to gain election to the Football League Third Division South in the middle of 1930, in place of Merthyr Town. Their request to join the league was considered alongside applications from Aldershot, Llanelli and Argonauts. The success of their application required them to suddenly upgrade the quality of the team. To achieve this objective, the newly promoted club placed an advert for "First Class Players Wanted. All Positions" in the June edition of the Athletic News. Thames continued to field a reserve side in the Southern League for a single further season, before withdrawing entirely in 1931.

Thames' spell in the Football League was a short and unhappy one. The club struggled to attract spectators. It established a supporters' group, which at one point had over 1,000 members. However, this effort did not translate into a reliable supporter base that would regularly attend matches. Despite the stadium's capacity of 120,000 (making it the largest ground in England to regularly host League football), the club holds the record for the lowest known attendance for a Saturday Football League match; just 469 fans paid to watch Thames play Luton Town on 6 December 1930.

Unable to compete with established teams nearby that included: Charlton Athletic, Clapton Orient, Millwall and West Ham United, Thames struggled. By December 1931, the club was under severe financial pressure. To keep the club afloat, the players agreed to take a pay cut. They finished 20th out of 22 clubs in 1930–31, and 22nd (i.e., bottom) the following season (1931–32). This prompted the club directors' decision not to seek re-election to the League for the following season and wind up the club, despite an approach from Clapton Orient to merge the two clubs. Their league place was taken by Aldershot.

Thames AFC are not the same club as Thames Ironworks FC, a club that predated them by over 30 years, and would go on to be renamed West Ham United.

=== Seasons ===
Season	League record									FA Cup
Season	Division	P	W	D	L	F	A	Pts	Pos	FA Cup
1928–29	Southern League Eastern Section	36	13	5	18	67	74	31	14th	—
1929–30	Southern League Eastern Section	32	17	6	9	80	60	40	3rd	First round
1930–31	Football League Third Division South	42	13	8	21	54	93	34	20th	First round
1931–32	Football League Third Division South	42	7	9	26	53	109	23	22nd	First round

== Players ==
Notable players for Thames included former England international Jimmy Dimmock, former Welsh internationals Len Davies and Moses Russell and ex-Arsenal striker Henry White. Eddie Perry went on to be a Welsh international.

== Colours ==
Thames' home colours were red and blue quartered shirts with white shorts and black socks with red and blue trim.

== Records and statistics ==
Thames' record for their two seasons in the Football League was played 84, won 20, drew 17, lost 47, scored 107 and conceded 202. The club's record league win was 6–3, against Mansfield Town on 2 April 1932, while their record league loss was 8–0, against Luton Town on 11 April 1931 and Fulham on 28 March 1932. The furthest they ever reached in the FA Cup was the First Round proper, in 1929–30, 1930–31 and 1931–32.

In total, 103,698 fans watched all of Thames' games, at an average of 2,469 per game, which ranks them as 122 out of all the 130 Football League teams in terms of attendance. The club's record highest attendance was approximately 8,000, against Exeter City in August 1931.
