= Kettering Town F.C. =

Association football club in Burton Latimer, England

Coordinates: 52°22′0″N 0°41′22″W

Kettering Town
- Full name: Kettering Town Football Club
- Nickname: The Poppies
- Founded: 1872
- Ground: Latimer Park, Burton Latimer
- Capacity: 3,029 (606 seated)
- Owner: Nadim Akhtar
- Chairman: Nadim Akhtar
- Manager: Nick Green
- League: Southern League Premier Division Central
- 2025–26: Southern League Premier Division Central, 4th of 22
- Website: ketteringtownfc.com
Home colours	Away colours

Kettering Town Football Club is a football club based in Burton Latimer, Northamptonshire, England. They are currently members of the Southern League Premier Division Central and play at Latimer Park. Kettering were the first English club to wear sponsorship on their shirts in 1976, and have scored more goals in the FA Cup than any other club.

== History ==
The club was established in 1872 under the name Kettering Football Club. They joined the Midland League in 1892 and were champions of the league in 1895–96, a season which also saw them beat two Football League clubs in the FA Cup; a 2–1 win over Loughborough in the third qualifying round was followed by a 2–1 win at Leicester Fosse in the fourth qualifying round before they lost 2–1 at Newton Heath in the first round. The club then also entered a team into the new United League, which they left in 1899. After winning the Midland League again in 1899–1900, the club applied for election to the Football League. However, they received only two votes and failed to gain entry to the League. Instead, the club joined Division One of the Southern League. In the 1900–01 FA Cup they reached the second round, beating Football League opponents Burton Swifts and Chesterfield before losing 5–0 at Middlesbrough.

After finishing bottom of Division One of the Southern League in 1903–04, Kettering dropped into the Northamptonshire League, where the reserve team had been playing. They won the league at the first attempt and were runners-up in the next three seasons. In 1909 the club rejoined the Southern League, playing in Division Two B, but also continued to enter the first team into the Northamptonshire League for another season; they went on to finish the 1909–10 season as runners-up in both leagues. League reorganisation saw them placed in Division Two of the Southern League for the following season.

In 1912 Kettering left the Southern League again, transferring to the Central Alliance. They played in the Alliance until returning to the Southern League in 1923, where they were placed in the Eastern Division. In 1924 the club were renamed Kettering Town after becoming a limited company. They were runners-up in the Eastern Division in 1924–25, and after finishing fourth in 1926–27 the club applied for Football League membership again, receiving only one vote. They were Eastern Division champions the following season and went on to win the overall Southern League championship, beating Bristol City Reserves 5–0 in a play-off. Another attempt at Football League membership saw them receive only three votes. After retaining the Eastern Division title in 1928–29 the club lost the championship play-off 4–2 to Plymouth Argyle Reserves. In the subsequent Football League elections they received only one vote.

In 1930 the club joined the Birmingham & District League, taking the place of their reserve team. However, after a single season the club dropped back into the Northamptonshire League. They were Northamptonshire League runners-up in 1932–33, after which they left to join the Central Combination. The club rejoined the Northamptonshire League, now named the United Counties League, in 1935 and were runners-up in their first season back in the league. They went on to win the league in 1938–39. In 1946 the club rejoined the Birmingham & District League and were league champions in 1947–48 and runners-up the following season. In 1950 they rejoined the Southern League.

Kettering were Southern League champions in 1956–57, after which they applied for Football League membership again, failing to receive a single vote. Despite only finishing eighth the following season the club received one vote in the Football League elections, a result that was to be repeated every year until 1961. In 1958 the Southern League was restructured, with Kettering placed in the North West Division. They were North West Division runners-up in 1958–59, earning a place in the Premier Division as the league was restructured again in 1959. However, they finished bottom of the Premier Division the following season and were relegated to Division One. The club won Division One at the first attempt and were promoted back to the Premier Division. Another attempt at Football League membership in 1962 saw the club fail to receive a vote.

At the end of the 1963–64 season Kettering were relegated to Division One again. Further unsuccessful attempts were made at Football League membership in 1967 and 1969, but they failed to win a vote on either occasion. After four seasons in the Division One, they were runners-up in 1967–68, earning promotion back to the Premier Division. In the 1968–69 FA Cup the club reached the third round, knocking out non-League clubs Waterlooville and Dartford before losing 2–1 to Bristol Rovers in a third round replay. They were relegated in 1970–71, this time to Division One North. However, the club won Division One North the following season and went onto win the Premier Division title in 1972–73. Following their league title, they applied for Football League membership, this time receiving 12 votes, still well below the 26 received by Darlington, the lowest ranked successful club. The following season saw them receive 16 votes, finishing as the highest-ranked non-League club and only five votes behind Fourth Division Workington. In 1975 the club received 20 votes, again the top-ranked non-League club, but this time eight votes behind Workington. Another application in 1976 saw them fall behind Yeovil Town.

Dougan with historic shirt

In 1975 Northern Irish international Derek Dougan was appointed player-manager and business manager. He negotiated a four figure shirt sponsorship with Kettering Tyres, which was the first such deal in England. After its use in the Southern League Premier Division match against Bath City on 24 January 1976 the FA demanded that the club remove the sponsor's logo threatening a fine of £1000, and were not impressed when Dougan initially attempted to circumvent the FA's demands by shortening the branding 'Kettering Tyres' to simply 'Kettering T', claiming the T stood for "Town". The logo was removed, though in June 1977 the FA decreed that a 2.5 square inch logo would be permitted in the future provided it was not "detrimental to the image of the game".

In 1976–77 Kettering reached the third round of the FA Cup again, beating Football League club Oxford United in the first round and non-League Tooting & Mitcham in the second round, before losing 3–2 at home to Colchester United in the third. The following season saw them reach the final of the FA Trophy, where they lost 2–0 to Stafford Rangers at Wembley. The club applied for the final time in 1979 after finishing as runners-up in the Southern League's Premier Division, by which time only two non-League clubs were allowed to enter the ballot, but they finished last behind Northern Premier League runners-up Altrincham. In 1979 the club were founder members of the Alliance Premier League, a single national division at the top of the non-League pyramid. They were runners-up in 1980–81 and again in 1988–89, a season which saw them reach the fourth round of the FA Cup; after beating Dartford in the first round, they defeated Football League opposition Bristol Rovers in the second round and Halifax Town in the third, before losing 2–1 at First Division Charlton Athletic in the fourth round.

Kettering were Conference runners-up again in 1993–94 and 1998–99. In 1999–2000 the club reached the final of the FA Trophy for a second time, losing 3–2 to Kingstonian in one of the last matches played at the old Wembley Stadium. They were relegated to the Southern League Premier Division at the end of the 2000–01 season, but won the division the following season, earning promotion back to the Football Conference. However, they finished bottom of the Conference in 2002–03 and were relegated again, this time of the Premier Division of the Isthmian League. A ninth-place finish in 2003–04 saw the club placed in the new Conference North for the 2004–05 season. A fourth-place finish led to them qualifying for the promotion play-offs, in which they beat Droylsden 2–1 in the semi-finals before losing 3–2 to Altrincham in the final. In 2006–07 the club were Conference North runners-up, but lost to 4–2 on aggregate Farsley Celtic in the play-off semi-finals. The following season saw them win the Conference North, earning promotion to the Conference National.

In the 2008–09 FA Cup Kettering reached the fourth round for a second time; after beating Lincoln City 2–1 in a first round replay and Notts County by the same score in a second round replay, the club defeated Eastwood Town in the third round. In the fourth they were drawn at home to Premier League club Fulham, where they lost 4–2. After losing their Rockingham Road ground in 2011, the club went into administration during the 2011–12 season, finishing bottom of the Conference National and were demoted two divisions to the Premier Division of the Southern League. They finished bottom of the Southern League Premier Division the following season and were relegated to Division One Central. A third-place finish in the division in 2013–14 saw them qualify for the play-offs, but after beating Daventry Town 1–0 in the semi-finals, they lost 3–2 to Slough Town in the final. In 2014–15 the club won the Division One Central title, earning promotion to the Premier Division. Following a fourth-place finish in the Premier Division in 2017–18, they lost 3–1 to Slough Town in the play-off semi-finals.

League reorganisation saw Kettering placed in the Premier Division Central for the 2018–19 season. The club went on to win the division, earning promotion to the National League North. In 2022–23 they finished fourth-from-bottom of the National League North and were relegated back to the Premier Division Central of the Southern League. In 2024–25 they beat county rivals Northampton Town 2–1 in the first round of the FA Cup, before losing 2–1 to Doncaster Rovers in the second round. The season saw them finish second in the league, going on to beat Harborough Town on penalties in the play-off semi-finals before losing 4–2 to AFC Telford United in the final. Kettering would earn another spot in the play-offs under Liam McDonald, finishing fourth, despite being close to the relegation zone halfway through the campaign. The Poppies were defeated by 3-1 in the semi-finals against Real Bedford.

=== Reserve team ===
Kettering reserves joined the Leicestershire Senior League in 1894, where they played for two seasons before joining Division One of the Northamptonshire League in 1896, winning it at the first attempt. They won the league again the following season, but were replaced by first team in 1904 and dropped into Division Two. When the first team left the league in 1910, the reserves took their place in Division One. In 1929–30 the reserves played in both the Northamptonshire League and the Birmingham & District League, with the first team replacing the reserves in the latter the following season. They finished bottom of Division One of the Northamptonshire League in 1930–31 and were relegated to Division Two as the first team rejoined the Northamptonshire League. The reserves were Division Two champions in 1932–33, and the following season saw them playing in the league's single division as the first team had left.

The reserves left the renamed United Counties League in 1935 when they were replaced by the first team. In 1945 they rejoined the Leicestershire Senior League, where they played for two seasons, also entering the United Counties League in 1946 after the first team left. In 1956 the reserves began playing in Division One South of the Central Alliance, while still playing in the United Counties League. They left the United Counties League in 1960 and the Central Alliance in 1961, when they rejoined the United Counties League. However, they left the United Counties League after a single season, instead joining the Metropolitan League, where they played for two seasons. In 1966 the reserves returned to the United Counties League. They left the league again in 1972, joining the Leicestershire Senior League in 1975. However, they withdrew from the league during the 1976–77 season.

== Ground ==
The club initially played at North Park, before moving to Green Lane and then Rockingham Road in 1897. In 2011 the club moved to Nene Park in Irthlingborough, but were forced to move to Steel Park in Corby in 2012. They moved to Burton Park Wanderers' Latimer Park in Burton Latimer the following year.

== Current squad ==
As of 20 March 2026

Note: Flags indicate national team as defined under FIFA eligibility rules; some limited exceptions apply. Players may hold more than one non-FIFA nationality.

No.	Pos.	Nation	Player
1	GK	IRL	Paul White
3	DF	WAL	Ben Isaacson
4	DF	ENG	George Forsyth (captain)
5	DF	ENG	Carl Mensah (on loan from Bedford Town)
7	MF	ENG	Wes York
8	MF	ALB	Andi Thanoj
9	FW	ENG	Kai Williams
9	FW	ENG	Nathan Jeche
10	FW	ENG	Eddie Panter
16	DF	ENG	Blaine Rowe

No.	Pos.	Nation	Player
17	MF	GBS	Ismael Fatadjo
20	DF	ENG	Lewis Coyle
20	MF	ENG	Will Van Lier (on loan from King's Lynn Town)
21	DF	ENG	Preston Bitemo (on loan from Hereford)
22	MF	ENG	Alfie Lewis
23	FW	ENG	Callum Powell
—	GK	ENG	Josh Humphrey
—	GK	ENG	Jason Alexander
—	MF	ENG	Kai Fifield

== Staff ==
Position	Name
Manager	Nick Green
Assistant Manager	David Bridgewater
First Team Coach	David Bridgewater
Goalkeeping Coach	Paul White
Physiotherapist	Michael Hunter
Kit Managers	Malcolm Lewer, Dan Willis & Aaron Lewer
Club Doctor	Dr. Clive Shackleton
Head of Academy	Josh McGoldrick

== Club officials ==
=== Boardroom positions ===
Position	Name
Chairman	(England) Nadim 'George' Akhtar
Director	(England) Nadiya Akhtar
Director	(England) Naheed Shears
Director	(England) Rob McGreavey
Director	(England) Tom Isaacs
Director	(England) Paula Conde-Sharpe
Director	(England) Paul Bailey
Director	(England) Ross Patrick
Director	(England) Yousef Miah
Director	(England) Fabian Forde

=== Managerial history ===
- 1956–1957: Tommy Lawton
- 1957–1958: Harry Mather
- 1958–1961: Jack Froggatt
- 1961–1963: Wally Akers
- 1963–1964: Tommy Lawton
- 1964–1965: Dick White
- 1965: George Swindin
- 1965–1971: Steve Gammon
- 1971–1974: Ron Atkinson
- 1974–1975: Geoff Vowden
- 1975–1977: Derek Dougan
- 1977–1979: Mick Jones
- 1979–1982: Colin Clarke
- 1983–1986: David Needham
- 1986–1988: Alan Buckley
- 1988–1992: Peter Morris
- 1992: Dave Cusack
- 1992–1995: Graham Carr
- 1995–1996: Gary Johnson
- 1996–1998: Steve Berry
- 1998–2001: Peter Morris
- 2001–2003: Carl Shutt
- 2003: Domenico Genovese
- 2003: Nick Platnauer (caretaker)
- 2003–2005: Kevin Wilson
- 2005: Paul Gascoigne
- 2005–2006: Kevin Wilson
- 2006–2007: Morell Maison
- 2007: Graham Westley (caretaker)
- 2007–2009: Mark Cooper
- 2009–2010: Lee Harper
- 2010: Morell Maison (caretaker)
- 2010–2011: Marcus Law
- 2011: Morell Maison
- 2011–2012: Mark Stimson
- 2012: Mark Cooper
- 2012: Ashley Westwood
- 2012: John Beck
- 2012–2013: Alan Doyle (caretaker)
- 2013: Thomas Baillie
- 2013–2014: Dean Thomas
- 2014–2015: Thomas Baillie & Scott Machin (joint)
- 2015–2019: Marcus Law
- 2019: Nicky Eaden
- 2019–2022: Paul Cox
- 2022: Ian Culverhouse
- 2022–2023: Lee Glover
- 2023-2024: Andy Leese
- 2023-2024: Jim LeMesurier
- 2024–2025: Richard Lavery
- 2025: Simon Hollyhead
- 2025-2026: Liam McDonald
- 2026: Nick Green

== Honours ==
- National League
  - Conference North champions 2007–08
  - League Cup winners 1986–87
- Midland League
  - Champions 1895–96, 1899–1900
- Southern League
  - Champions 1927–28, 1956–57, 1972–73, 2001–02
  - Premier Division Central champions 2018–19
  - Division One champions 1960–61
  - Division One Central champions 2014–15
  - Division One North champions 1971–72
  - Eastern Division champions 1927–28, 1928–29
  - League Cup winners 1974–75
- United Counties League
  - Champions 1904–05, 1938–39
- Northamptonshire Senior Cup
  - Winners 1883–84, 1895–86, 1897–98, 1900–01, 1906–07, 1920–21 (reserves), 1931–32, 1932–33, 1935–36, 1938–39, 1946–47, 1952–53 (reserves), 1955–56, 1956–57 (reserves), 1968–69, 1972–73, 1978–79, 1979–80, 1983–84, 1984–85, 1985–86, 1986–87, 1987–88, 1991–92, 1992–93, 1994–95, 1996–97, 2000–01, 2016–17, 2017–18
- Maunsell Cup
  - Winners 1912–13, 1919–20, 1923–24 (joint), 1924–25, 1928–29, 1947–48, 1951–52, 1954–55, 1959–60, 1984–85, 1987–88, 1988–89, 1992–93, 1993–94, 1998–99, 2016–17

== Records ==
- Best FA Cup performance: Fourth round, 1988–89, 2008–09
- Best FA Trophy performance: Finalists, 1978–79, 1999–2000
- Record attendance: 11,536 vs Peterborough United, FA Cup first round replay, 1958–59
- Biggest win: 16–0 vs Higham YMCI, FA Cup, 1909
- Heaviest defeat: 13–0 vs Mardy, Southern League Division Two, 1911–12
- Most appearances: Roger Ashby
- Most goals: Roy Clayton, 171 (1972–1981)
- Record transfer fee received: £150,000 from Newcastle United for Andy Hunt, 1991
- Record transfer fee paid: £25,000 to Macclesfield Town for Carl Alford, 1994

== See also ==
- Kettering Town F.C. players
- Kettering Town F.C. managers
- James Acaster: Repertoire (Chant)
