= Peterborough & Fletton United F.C. =

Peterborough & Fletton United
- Full name: Peterborough & Fletton United Football Club
- Nickname: The Brickies
- Founded: 1901
- Dissolved: 1932
- Ground: London Road, Peterborough
- 1931–32: Southern League Eastern Section, 8th of 10
Home colours

Peterborough & Fletton United F.C. was an English football club based in Peterborough, Cambridgeshire. The club existed until 1932 and played at London Road.

== History ==
The club was originally established as Fletton United in 1901. They were founder members of the Peterborough & District League in 1902 and were its inaugural champions, remaining unbeaten in the league's first season. After retaining the league title in both of the next two seasons, the club left the league and joined Division One of the Northamptonshire League. They finished bottom of the league in 1913–14, but were runners-up in 1921–22.

After finishing third in 1922–23, the club were voted into the Eastern Section of the Southern League, at which point they adopted the name Peterborough & Fletton United in an attempt to gain the backing of tradesmen and people of Peterborough, and give other Southern League clubs an idea of their geographical location. In their first season in the league they won the Eastern Section, and went on to beat Yeovil 3–1 in the championship play-off. In 1927–28 they reached the third round of the FA Cup, where they lost 4–3 to Birmingham, having been 3–0 up. At the end of the season they applied for the elections to Division Three South of the Football League, but received only two votes.

After finishing eighth out of ten clubs in 1931–32 the club left the Southern League, intending to join the East Midlands. However, with the club deep in financial trouble, on 6 August 1931 the Football Association suspended the club until it paid the £154 due in wages to players. In November 1932 the club went into voluntary liquidation with debts of £1,750.

A new club, Peterborough United, was formed as a replacement in 1934.

== Colours ==
The club wore claret and gold stripes.

== Ground ==
The club's ground was on London Road.

== Honours ==
- Peterborough & District League
  - Champions 1902–03, 1903–04, 1904–05

== See also ==
- Peterborough & Fletton United F.C. players
