= Southern Football League =

English association football league

- Founded: 1894
- Country: England
- Number of clubs: 88: Central Division: 22; South Division: 22; Division One Central: 22; Division One South: 22
- Level on pyramid: Levels 7–8
- Promotion to: National League North or South
- Relegation to: Combined Counties League North; Essex Senior League; Hellenic League; Spartan South Midlands League; United Counties League South; Wessex League; Western League
- Domestic cup(s): FA Cup; FA Trophy
- Current champions: Harborough Town (Premier Division Central); Walton & Hersham (Premier Division South); Leighton Town (Division One Central); Frome Town (Division One South) (2025–26)
- Website: Official website
- Current: 2026–27 season

The Southern Football League is a football competition featuring semi-professional clubs from East Anglia, the South and the Midlands of England. Together with the Isthmian League and the Northern Premier League it forms levels seven and eight of the English football league system.

The structure of the Southern League has changed several times since its formation in 1894, and currently there are 87 clubs which are divided into four divisions. The Premier Central and South Divisions are at step 3 of the National League System (NLS), and are feeder divisions, mainly to the National League South but also to the National League North. Feeding the Premier Divisions are two regional divisions, Division One Central and Division One South, which are at step 4 of the NLS. These divisions are, in turn fed by various regional leagues.

The league has its administrative head office at Eastgate House in Gloucester.

== History ==
=== Football in the south of England ===
Professional football (and, indeed, professional sports in general) developed more slowly in Southern England than in Northern England. Professionalism was first sanctioned by The Football Association as early as 1885, but when The Football League was founded in 1888, its member clubs were based entirely in the North and Midlands, as the county football associations in the South were firmly opposed to professionalism.

Woolwich Arsenal (nowadays simply Arsenal) were the first club in London to turn professional in 1891 and were one of the prime motivators behind an attempt to set up a Southern League to mirror the existing Northern and Midlands based Football League. However, this venture failed in the face of opposition from the London Football Association, and Woolwich Arsenal instead joined the Football League as its only representative south of Birmingham in 1893. Additionally, an amateur league, the Southern Alliance, was founded in 1892, with seven clubs from the region, but that folded after one incomplete season.

=== Formation of the Southern League ===
Nonetheless, another attempt was made to form the Southern League, and this time it was successful. A competition for both professional and amateur clubs was founded in 1894 under the initiative of Millwall Athletic (now simply Millwall). Initially only one division was envisaged, but such was the enthusiasm for the idea, that eventually two divisions were formed. The sixteen original founder members were:

| Division One Chatham Clapton Ilford Luton Town Millwall Athletic Reading Royal Ordnance Factories 2nd Scots Guards Swindon Town | Division Two Bromley Chesham Maidenhead New Brompton Old St Stephen's Sheppey United Uxbridge |

2nd Scots Guards withdrew before the first season started and were replaced by Southampton St Mary's. Woolwich Arsenal attempted to add their reserve side to the second division but this application was refused due to the club's existing membership of The Football League.

=== Success of the Southern League ===
The Southern League soon became the dominant competition below The Football League in Southern and Central England, and by the turn of the century a few of the Southern League sides began to seriously rival the Football League in the FA Cup. A preview of the 1900–01 season in the Daily News described the league as "now, without a doubt, second only in importance and the strength of its clubs to the Football League itself. With the exception of Woolwich Arsenal, who prefer to remain members of the Second Division of the Football League, all the best professional teams in the South are now enrolled in the ranks of the Southern League".

Two Southern League clubs, Southampton (in 1900 and 1902) and Tottenham Hotspur (in 1901) reached the final of the FA Cup around the turn of the twentieth century. Tottenham Hotspur remain the only club from outside the Football League (and since its inception, also the Premier League) to have won the FA Cup.

Several of the best players in England moved from the Football League to the Southern League around this time, due to the restrictions on their freedom of movement and wages implemented by the Football League between 1893 and 1901, and the failed efforts of the Association Footballers' Union (the AFU) to relax the restrictions. This ended in 1910 when the League came to a reciprocal agreement with the Football League.

The champions of the two leagues during this period met in the annual Charity Shield. Out of the six meetings the respective league champions had in the Shield, however, only one was won by the Southern League champions – Brighton & Hove Albion, in 1910, and this remains their only top level national honour. Up until World War I, the league also organised several representative 'inter-league' matches, against the Football League XI and the Scottish Football League XI. They won the inaugural inter-league equivalent of the British Home Championship in 1910, defeating the Football League 3–2, Scottish League 1–0 and the Irish League 4–0.

In 1907, it accepted newly converted-to-Association and future Football League club Bradford, a northern club, as a member, reflecting its senior position at the time. Stalybridge Celtic and Stoke also joined before the First World War.

In 1920, virtually the entire top division of the Southern League was absorbed by the Football League to become that league's new Third Division. A year later the Third Division was expanded and regionalised. The Third Division clubs from the previous season became the Third Division South, with the addition of the Third Division North.

Of the original founder members, seven – Bromley, Gillingham (formerly New Brompton), Luton Town, Millwall, Reading, Southampton and Swindon Town – went on to be Football League clubs.

=== 1920-1979: an unofficial feeder league ===
For the next six decades, the Football League and Southern League would occasionally exchange a limited number of clubs as a result of the older league's re-election process. From 1920 onward, the Southern League's status as a semi-professional league was firmly established. In 1977, Wimbledon became the last Southern League club to successfully achieve election into the Football League.

=== 1979 onwards: incorporation into Non-League pyramid system ===
With its clubs seeking a more regular means of advancing to the Football League, in 1979 the Southern League became a feeder to the new Alliance Premier League along with the Isthmian League and the Northern Premier League, and the top Southern clubs of the day joined the new league. In turn, the APL (renamed Football Conference in 1986 and National League in 2015) would eventually succeed in becoming a feeder to the Football League. The league lost more of its top clubs in 2004 when the Conference added two regional divisions below the existing National League, the Conference South and Conference North.

In May 2017, the FA chose the Southern League to add an additional division at step 3 as part of another restructuring in the NLS; the two Premier Divisions were set at 22 clubs each. The new Central Division started playing in the 2018–19 season.

=== Sponsorship ===
The first sponsor of the Southern League was Beazer Homes who sponsored the league from 1987 to 1996. The sponsors after Beazer Homes to the present day are: Dr Martens (1996–2004), British Gas (2006–2009), Zamaretto (2009–2011), Evo-Stik (2011–2013), Calor Gas (2013–2014), Evo-Stik (2014–2019) and BetVictor (2019–2020). From the 2020–21 season the league has been sponsored by Pitching In, Entain's grassroots sports investment programme. At the time of announcement, Entain went by its former name GVC Holdings. Under this partnership, the Southern League is marketed as one of the three Trident Leagues, alongside its Isthmian and Northern Premier counterparts.

== Current members ==
=== Premier Central ===
| Club | Home ground |
|---|---|
| Alvechurch | Lye Meadow |
| Anstey Nomads | Marks Electrical Arena |
| Banbury United | Spencer Stadium |
| Bishop's Stortford | Woodside Park |
| Bromsgrove Sporting | Victoria Ground |
| Bury Town | Ram Meadow |
| Halesowen Town | The Grove |
| Hitchin Town | Top Field |
| Kettering Town | Latimer Park |
| Leamington | Your Co-op Community Stadium |
| Leighton Town | Freed Veneers Community Stadium |
| Leiston | Victory Road |
| Needham Market | Bloomfields |
| Peterborough Sports | Bee Arena |
| Racing Club Warwick | Townsend Meadow |
| Real Bedford | McMullen Park |
| Redditch United | Valley Stadium |
| Rushall Olympic | Dales Lane |
| Stamford | Zeeco Stadium |
| Stourbridge | War Memorial Athletic Ground |
| Stratford Town | Knights Lane |
| Worcester City | Sixways Stadium |

Locations of the Southern Football League clubs by division
– Prem Central

=== Premier South ===
| Club | Home ground |
|---|---|
| Basingstoke Town | Winklebury Football Complex |
| Bath City | Twerton Park |
| Berkhamsted | Glencar Community Stadium |
| Bracknell Town | Bottom Meadow |
| Chertsey Town | Alwyns Lane |
| Chichester City | Oaklands Park |
| Chippenham Town | Hardenhuish Park |
| Evesham United | The Spiers & Hartwell Stadium |
| Frome Town | Badgers Hill |
| Gloucester City | Meadow Park |
| Gosport Borough | Privett Park |
| Hanwell Town | Reynolds Field |
| Hanworth Villa | Rectory Meadow |
| Havant & Waterlooville | Westleigh Park |
| Malvern Town | Langland Stadium |
| Plymouth Parkway | Bolitho Park |
| Poole Town | Tatnam Ground |
| Sholing | Portsmouth Road |
| Taunton Town | Wordsworth Drive |
| Uxbridge | Honeycroft |
| Wimborne Town | New Cuthbury |
| Yate Town | Lodge Road |

Locations of the Southern Football League clubs by division
– Prem South

=== Division One Central ===
| Club | Home ground |
|---|---|
| Aylesbury United | The Meadow |
| Barton Rovers | Sharpenhoe Road |
| Beaconsfield Town | Holloways Park |
| Biggleswade | The Eyrie |
| Biggleswade Town | Langford Road |
| Didcot Town | Loop Meadow |
| Flackwell Heath | Wilks Park |
| Hadley | Brickfield Lane |
| Haringey Borough | Coles Park Stadium |
| Hertford Town | Hertingfordbury Park |
| Leverstock Green | Pancake Lane |
| London Lions | Rowley Lane |
| Marlow | Alfred Davis Memorial Ground |
| Milton Keynes Irish | The Irish Centre |
| Potters Bar Town | Lantern Stadium |
| Royston Town | Garden Walk |
| Stotfold | New Roker Park |
| Thame United | Meadow View Park |
| Waltham Abbey | Capershotts |
| Ware | Wodson Park |
| Welwyn Garden City | Herns Way |
| Winslow United | Elmfields Gate |

Locations of the Southern Football League clubs by division
– Div One Central

=== Division One South ===
| Club | Home ground |
|---|---|
| Barnstaple Town | Mill Road |
| Bideford | The Sports Ground |
| Bishop's Cleeve | Kayte Lane |
| Bristol Manor Farm | The Creek |
| Dorchester Town | The Avenue Stadium |
| Exmouth Town | Southern Road |
| Falmouth Town | Bickland Park |
| Hartpury | Hartpury University Stadium |
| Hungerford Town | Bulpit Lane |
| Larkhall Athletic | Plain Ham |
| Melksham Town | Oakfield Stadium |
| Pauton Rovers | Winterfield Stadium |
| Portland United | Camp & Satherley Stadium |
| Shaftesbury | Cockrams |
| Slimbridge | Thornhill Park |
| Sporting Club Inkberrow | Sands Road |
| Swindon Supermarine | Webbswood Stadium |
| Tiverton Town | Ladysmead |
| Westbury United | Meadow Lane |
| Weymouth | Bob Lucas Stadium |
| Willand Rovers | Silver Street |
| Worcester Raiders | DOADC Stadium |

Locations of the Southern Football League clubs by division
– Div One South

== Champions ==
This section lists the past winners of the Southern League. Winners to 1993 source:

| Season | Division One | Division Two |
|---|---|---|
| 1894–95 | Millwall Athletic | New Brompton |
| 1895–96 | Millwall Athletic | Wolverton L & NWR |
| 1896–97 | Southampton St Mary's | Dartford |
| 1897–98 | Southampton | Royal Artillery Portsmouth |

For the 1898–99 season, Division Two was divided into London and South-West sections, with a playoff contested between the winners of each section.

| Season | Division One | Division Two (London) | Division Two (SW) | Division Two Playoff |
|---|---|---|---|---|
| 1898–99 | Southampton | Thames Ironworks | Cowes | Thames won 3–1 |

For the 1899–1900 season, the league reverted to the old format, after all the members of the South-West section resigned.

| Season | Division One | Division Two |
|---|---|---|
| 1899–1900 | Tottenham Hotspur | Watford |
| 1900–01 | Southampton | Brentford |
| 1901–02 | Portsmouth | Fulham |
| 1902–03 | Southampton | Fulham |
| 1903–04 | Southampton | Watford |
| 1904–05 | Bristol Rovers | Fulham Reserves |
| 1905–06 | Fulham | Crystal Palace |
| 1906–07 | Fulham | Southend United |
| 1907–08 | Queens Park Rangers | Southend United |
| 1908–09 | Northampton Town | Croydon Common |

For the 1909–10 season, Division Two was split into an 'A' section and a 'B' section, with the winners of each section contesting a play-off for the Division Two championship.

| Season | Division One | Division Two (A) | Division Two (B) | Division Two Playoff |
|---|---|---|---|---|
| 1909–10 | Brighton & Hove Albion | Stoke | Hastings & St Leonards United | Stoke won 6–0 |

For the 1910–11 season, the league again reverted to the previous format.

| Season | Division One | Division Two |
|---|---|---|
| 1910–11 | Swindon Town | Reading |
| 1911–12 | Queens Park Rangers | Merthyr Town |
| 1912–13 | Plymouth Argyle | Cardiff City |
| 1913–14 | Swindon Town | Croydon Common |
| 1914–15 | Watford | Stoke |
| 1919–20 | Portsmouth | Mid Rhondda |

At the end of the 1919–20 season, the majority of the clubs in the First Division moved into the new Third Division of the Football League. The Southern League was therefore split into two sections for England and Wales, with the winners of each section contesting a playoff for the Southern League championship.

| Season | English Section | Welsh Section | Championship Playoff |
|---|---|---|---|
| 1920–21 | Brighton & Hove Albion | Barry | Brighton won 2–1 |
| 1921–22 | Plymouth Argyle Reserves | Ebbw Vale | Plymouth won 3–0 |
| 1922–23 | Bristol City Reserves | Ebbw Vale | Ebbw Vale won 2–1 |

For the 1923–24 season, the league was split into two regional sections, with the winners of each section contesting a playoff for the Southern League championship.

| Season | Eastern Section | Western Section | Championship Playoff |
|---|---|---|---|
| 1923–24 | Peterborough & Fletton United | Yeovil & Petters United | Peterborough won 3–1 |
| 1924–25 | Southampton Reserves | Swansea Town Reserves | Southampton won 2–1 |
| 1925–26 | Millwall Reserves | Plymouth Argyle Reserves | Plymouth won 1–0 |
| 1926–27 | Brighton & Hove Albion Reserves | Torquay United | Brighton won 4–0 |
| 1927–28 | Kettering Town | Bristol City Reserves | Kettering won 5–0 |
| 1928–29 | Kettering Town | Plymouth Argyle Reserves | Plymouth won 4–2 |
| 1929–30 | Aldershot Town | Bath City | Aldershot won 3–2 |
| 1930–31 | Dartford | Exeter City Reserves | Dartford won 7–2 |
| 1931–32 | Dartford | Yeovil & Petters United | Dartford won 2–1 |
| 1932–33 | Norwich City Reserves | Bath City | Norwich won 2–1 |

For the 1933–34 season an extra section, the Central Section was introduced to provide additional fixtures. The Central included clubs from the other two sections and did not contribute to the overall championship.

| Season | Eastern Section | Western Section | Central Section | Championship Playoff |
|---|---|---|---|---|
| 1933–34 | Norwich City Reserves | Plymouth Argyle Reserves | Plymouth Argyle Reserves | Plymouth won 3–0 |
| 1934–35 | Norwich City Reserves | Yeovil & Petters United | Folkestone | Norwich won 7–2 |
| 1935–36 | Margate | Plymouth Argyle Reserves | Margate | Margate won 3–1 |

For the 1936–37 season, the Eastern and Western sections were merged into a single division. Additional fixtures were obtained through the Midweek Section which did not contribute to the overall championship.

| Season | Southern League | Midweek Section |
|---|---|---|
| 1936–37 | Ipswich Town | Margate |
| 1937–38 | Guildford City | Millwall Reserves |
| 1938–39 | Colchester United | Tunbridge Wells Rangers |

For the 1945–46 season, the Midweek Section was not played due to power restrictions after World War II.

| Season | Southern League |
|---|---|
| 1945–46 | Chelmsford City |
| 1946–47 | Gillingham |
| 1947–48 | Merthyr Tydfil |
| 1948–49 | Gillingham |
| 1949–50 | Merthyr Tydfil |
| 1950–51 | Merthyr Tydfil |
| 1951–52 | Merthyr Tydfil |
| 1952–53 | Headington United |
| 1953–54 | Merthyr Tydfil |
| 1954–55 | Yeovil Town |
| 1955–56 | Guildford City |
| 1956–57 | Kettering Town |
| 1957–58 | Gravesend & Northfleet |

For the 1958–59 season the Southern League was again divided into two sections: North-Western and South-Eastern. The winners of each section contested a playoff for the Southern League championship.

| Season | North-Western Section | South-Eastern Section | Championship Playoff |
|---|---|---|---|
| 1958–59 | Hereford United | Bedford Town | Bedford won 2–1 |

The following season saw the two sections merged to form a Premier Division, and a new Division One introduced.

| Season | Premier Division | Division One |
|---|---|---|
| 1959–60 | Bath City | Clacton Town |
| 1960–61 | Oxford United | Kettering Town |
| 1961–62 | Oxford United | Wisbech Town |
| 1962–63 | Cambridge City | Margate |
| 1963–64 | Yeovil Town | Folkestone Town |
| 1964–65 | Weymouth | Hereford United |
| 1965–66 | Weymouth | Barnet |
| 1966–67 | Romford | Dover |
| 1967–68 | Chelmsford City | Worcester City |
| 1968–69 | Cambridge United | Brentwood Town |
| 1969–70 | Cambridge United | Bedford Town |
| 1970–71 | Yeovil Town | Guildford City |

For the 1971–72 season Division One was regionalised.

| Season | Premier Division | Division One North | Division One South |
|---|---|---|---|
| 1971–72 | Chelmsford City | Kettering Town | Waterlooville |
| 1972–73 | Kettering Town | Grantham | Maidstone United |
| 1973–74 | Dartford | Stourbridge | Wealdstone |
| 1974–75 | Wimbledon | Bedford Town | Gravesend & Northfleet |
| 1975–76 | Wimbledon | Redditch United | Minehead |
| 1976–77 | Wimbledon | Worcester City | Barnet |
| 1977–78 | Bath City | Witney Town | Margate |
| 1978–79 | Worcester City | Grantham | Dover |

For the 1979–80 season, thirteen Premier Division clubs joined the newly formed Alliance Premier League. The Premier Division and Division One were subsequently merged, and two regional divisions formed.

| Season | Midland Division | Southern Division |
|---|---|---|
| 1979–80 | Bridgend Town | Dorchester Town |
| 1980–81 | Alvechurch | Dartford |
| 1981–82 | Nuneaton Borough | Wealdstone |

For the 1982–83 season, the Premier Division was re-introduced, above the regional divisions.

| Season | Premier Division | Midland Division | Southern Division |
|---|---|---|---|
| 1982–83 | AP Leamington | Cheltenham Town | Fisher Athletic |
| 1983–84 | Dartford | Willenhall Town | Road-Sea Southampton |
| 1984–85 | Cheltenham Town | Dudley Town | Basingstoke Town |
| 1985–86 | Welling United | Bromsgrove Rovers | Cambridge City |
| 1986–87 | Fisher Athletic | VS Rugby | Dorchester Town |
| 1987–88 | Aylesbury United | Merthyr Tydfil | Dover Athletic |
| 1988–89 | Merthyr Tydfil | Gloucester City | Chelmsford City |
| 1989–90 | Dover Athletic | Halesowen Town | Bashley |
| 1990–91 | Farnborough Town | Stourbridge | Buckingham Town |
| 1991–92 | Bromsgrove Rovers | Solihull Borough | Hastings Town |
| 1992–93 | Dover Athletic | Nuneaton Borough | Sittingbourne |
| 1993–94 | Farnborough Town | Rushden & Diamonds | Gravesend & Northfleet |
| 1994–95 | Hednesford Town | Newport County | Salisbury City |
| 1995–96 | Rushden & Diamonds | Nuneaton Borough | Sittingbourne |
| 1996–97 | Gresley Rovers | Tamworth | Forest Green Rovers |
| 1997–98 | Forest Green Rovers | Grantham Town | Weymouth |
| 1998–99 | Nuneaton Borough | Clevedon Town | Havant & Waterlooville |

For the 1999–2000 season, the regional divisions were renamed the Eastern and Western divisions.

| Season | Premier Division | Eastern Division | Western Division |
|---|---|---|---|
| 1999–2000 | Boston United | Fisher Athletic | Stafford Rangers |
| 2000–01 | Margate | Newport IOW | Hinckley United |
| 2001–02 | Kettering Town | Hastings Town | Halesowen Town |
| 2002–03 | Tamworth | Dorchester Town | Merthyr Tydfil |
| 2003–04 | Crawley Town | King's Lynn | Redditch United |
| 2004–05 | Histon | Fisher Athletic | Mangotsfield United |
| 2005–06 | Salisbury City | Boreham Wood | Clevedon Town |

For the 2006–07 season, the two regional divisions were renamed Division One Midlands and Division One South & West.

| Season | Premier Division | Division One Midlands | Division One South & West |
|---|---|---|---|
| 2006–07 | Bath City | Brackley Town | Bashley |
| 2007–08 | King's Lynn | Evesham United | Farnborough |
| 2008–09 | Corby Town | Leamington | Truro City |

For the 2009–10 season, Division One Midlands was renamed Division One Central.

| Season | Premier Division | Division One Central | Division One South & West |
|---|---|---|---|
| 2009–10 | Farnborough | Bury Town | Windsor & Eton |
| 2010–11 | Truro City | Arlesey Town | AFC Totton |
| 2011–12 | Brackley Town | St Neots Town | Bideford |
| 2012–13 | Leamington | Burnham | Poole Town |
| 2013–14 | Hemel Hempstead Town | Dunstable Town | Cirencester Town |
| 2014–15 | Corby Town | Kettering Town | Merthyr Town |
| 2015–16 | Poole Town | Kings Langley | Cinderford Town |
| 2016–17 | Chippenham Town | Royston Town | Hereford |

For the 2017–18 season, the Central and South & West divisions were renamed back into East and West respectively.

| Season | Premier Division | East Division | West Division |
|---|---|---|---|
| 2017–18 | Hereford | Beaconsfield Town | Taunton Town |

For the following season, the Premier Division was regionalised, becoming the South Division, and a Central Division was added. The East and West divisions were realigned into Central and South again.

| Season | Premier Division Central | Premier Division South | Division One Central | Division One South |
|---|---|---|---|---|
| 2018–19 | Kettering Town | Weymouth | Peterborough Sports | Blackfield & Langley |
| 2019–20^{1} | Tamworth | Truro City | Berkhamsted | Thatcham Town |
| 2020–21^{2} | Coalville Town | Poole Town | Corby Town | Cirencester Town |
| 2021–22 | Banbury United | Taunton Town | Bedford Town | Plymouth Parkway |
| 2022–23 | Tamworth | Weston-super-Mare | Berkhamsted | AFC Totton |
| 2023–24 | Needham Market | Chesham United | Biggleswade Town | Wimborne Town |
| 2024–25 | Bedford Town | Merthyr Town | Real Bedford | Yate Town |
| 2025–26 | Harborough Town | Walton & Hersham | Leighton Town | Frome Town |

^{1} The 2019–20 season was terminated on 26 March 2020 due to the coronavirus pandemic; the teams listed here were in first place in the standings at the time of the termination, but were not recognised as champions.

^{2} The 2020–21 season was also terminated on 24 February 2021 due to the coronavirus pandemic; the teams listed here were in first place in the standings at the time of the termination, but were not recognised as champions.

=== Promoted ===
Since the league's formation in 1894, the following clubs have won promotion to higher levels of the English football league system -

| Seasons | Promoted to |
|---|---|
| 1892–1921 | Football League Second Division |
| 1920–1921 | Football League Third Division |
| 1921–1958 | Football League Third Division South |
| 1958–1979 | Football League Fourth Division |
| 1979–1986 | Alliance Premier League |
| 1986–2003 | Football Conference |
| 2003–2004 | Football Conference National |
| 2004–2015 | Football Conference North |
| 2004–2015 | Football Conference South |
| 2015–present | National League North |
| 2015–present | National League South |

| Season | Club | Position | Promoted to |
|---|---|---|---|
| 1900–01 | Bristol City | 2nd | Football League Second Division |
| 1904–05 | Clapton Orient (D2) | 8th | Football League Second Division |
| 1906–07 | Fulham | 1st | Football League Second Division |
| 1907–08 | Bradford Park Avenue; Tottenham Hotspur | 13th 7th | Football League Second Division; Football League Second Division |
| 1914–15 | Stoke (D2); Coventry City (D2); West Ham United (D1) | 1st 5th 1st | Football League Second Division; Football League Second Division; Football League Second Division |
| 1919–20 | Cardiff City; Portsmouth; Watford; Crystal Palace; Plymouth Argyle; Queens Park Rangers; Reading; Southampton; Swansea Town; Exeter City; Southend United; Norwich City; Swindon Town; Millwall; Brentford; Brighton & Hove Albion; Bristol Rovers; Newport County; Northampton Town; Luton Town; Merthyr Town; Gillingham | 4th 1st 2nd 3rd 5th 6th 7th 8th 9th 10th 11th 12th 13th 14th 15th 16th 17th 18th 19th 20th 21st 22nd | Football League Second Division; Football League Third Division; Football League Third Division; Football League Third Division; Football League Third Division; Football League Third Division; Football League Third Division; Football League Third Division; Football League Third Division; Football League Third Division; Football League Third Division; Football League Third Division; Football League Third Division; Football League Third Division; Football League Third Division; Football League Third Division; Football League Third Division; Football League Third Division; Football League Third Division; Football League Third Division; Football League Third Division; Football League Third Division |
| 1920–21 | Charlton Athletic (SLes); Aberdare Athletic (SLws) | 8th 2nd | Football League Third Division S Football League Third Division S |
| 1922–23 | Boscombe (SLes) | 2nd | Football League Third Division S |
| 1926–27 | Torquay United (SLwd) | 1st | Football League Third Division S |
| 1929–30 | Thames Association(SLed) | 3rd | Football League Third Division S |
| 1931–32 | Aldershot Town (SLed); Newport County (SLwd) | 9th 6th | Football League Third Division S Football League Third Division S |
| 1937–38 | Ipswich Town | 3rd | Football League Third Division S |
| 1949–50 | Colchester United; Gillingham | 2nd 5th | Football League Third Division S Football League Third Division S |
| 1961–62 | Oxford United (PD) | 1st | Football League Fourth Division |
| 1969–70 | Cambridge United (PD) | 1st | Football League Fourth Division |
| 1971–72 | Hereford United (PD) | 2nd | Football League Fourth Division |
| 1976–77 | Wimbledon (PD) | 1st | Football League Fourth Division |
| 1978–79 | Worcester City; Kettering Town; Telford United; Maidstone United; Bath City; Weymouth; AP Leamington; Redditch United; Yeovil Town; Nuneaton Borough; Gravesend & Northfleet; Barnet; Wealdstone | 1st 2nd 3rd 4th 5th 6th 7th 8th 9th 11th 12th 13th 15th | Alliance Premier League; Alliance Premier League; Alliance Premier League; Alliance Premier League; Alliance Premier League; Alliance Premier League; Alliance Premier League; Alliance Premier League; Alliance Premier League; Alliance Premier League; Alliance Premier League; Alliance Premier League; Alliance Premier League |
| 1980–81 | Trowbridge Town (md); Dartford (sd) | 3rd 1st | Alliance Premier League; Alliance Premier League |
| 1981–82 | Nuneaton Borough (md); Wealdstone (sd) | 1st 1st | Alliance Premier League; Alliance Premier League |
| 1982–83 | Kidderminster Harriers | 2nd | Alliance Premier League |
| 1983–84 | Dartford | 1st | Alliance Premier League |
| 1984–85 | Cheltenham Town | 1st | Alliance Premier League |
| 1985–86 | Welling United | 1st | Football Conference |
| 1986–87 | Fisher Athletic | 1st | Football Conference |
| 1987–88 | Aylesbury United | 1st | Football Conference |
| 1988–89 | Merthyr Tydfil | 1st | Football Conference |
| 1989–90 | Bath City | 2nd | Football Conference |
| 1990–91 | Farnborough Town | 1st | Football Conference |
| 1991–92 | Bromsgrove Rovers | 1st | Football Conference |
| 1992–93 | Dover Athletic | 1st | Football Conference |
| 1993–94 | Farnborough Town | 1st | Football Conference |
| 1994–95 | Hednesford Town | 1st | Football Conference |
| 1995–96 | Rushden & Diamonds | 1st | Football Conference |
| 1996–97 | Cheltenham Town | 2nd | Football Conference |
| 1997–98 | Forest Green Rovers | 1st | Football Conference |
| 1998–99 | Nuneaton Borough | 1st | Football Conference |
| 1999–00 | Boston United | 1st | Football Conference |
| 2000–01 | Margate | 1st | Football Conference |
| 2001–02 | Kettering Town | 1st | Football Conference |
| 2002–03 | Tamworth | 1st | Football Conference |
| 2003–04 | Crawley Town; Stafford Rangers; Nuneaton Borough; Worcester City; Hinckley United; Moor Green; Weymouth; Newport County; Cambridge City; Welling United; Weston-super-Mare; Eastbourne Borough; Havant & Waterlooville; Dorchester Town; Redditch United (SLwd) | 1st 3rd 4th 5th 6th 13th 2nd 7th 8th 9th 10th 11th 12th 17th* 1st* | Football Conference National; Football Conference North; Football Conference North; Football Conference North; Football Conference North; Football Conference North; Football Conference South; Football Conference South; Football Conference South; Football Conference South; Football Conference South; Football Conference South; Football Conference South; Football Conference South; Football Conference North |
| 2004–05 | Histon; Hednesford Town | 1st 4th* | Football Conference South; Football Conference North |
| 2005–06 | Salisbury City; Bedford Town | 1st 5th* | Football Conference South; Football Conference South |
| 2006–07 | Bath City; Maidenhead United | 1st 4th* | Football Conference South; Football Conference South |
| 2007–08 | King's Lynn; Team Bath | 1st 2nd* | Football Conference North; Football Conference South |
| 2008–09 | Corby Town; Gloucester City | 1st 3rd* | Football Conference North; Football Conference North |
| 2009–10 | Farnborough; Nuneaton Town | 1st 2nd* | Football Conference South; Football Conference North |
| 2010–11 | Truro City; Salisbury City | 1st 3rd* | Football Conference South; Football Conference South |
| 2011–12 | Brackley Town; Oxford City | 1st 2nd* | Football Conference North; Football Conference North |
| 2012–13 | Leamington; Gosport Borough | 1st 5th* | Football Conference North; Football Conference South |
| 2013–14 | Hemel Hempstead Town; St Albans City | 1st 4th* | Football Conference South; Football Conference South |
| 2014–15 | Corby Town; Truro City | 1st 3rd* | National League North; National League South |
| 2015–16 | Poole Town; Hungerford Town | 1st 4th* | National League South; National League South |
| 2016–17 | Chippenham Town; Leamington | 1st 2nd* | National League South; National League North |
| 2017–18 | Hereford; Slough Town | 1st 3rd* | National League North; National League South |
| 2018–19 | Kettering Town (PDC); King's Lynn Town (PDC); Weymouth (PDS) | 1st 2nd* 1st | National League North; National League North; National League South |
| 2019–20 | No promotion to National League North or South | | |
| 2020–21 | Step 3 promotion cancelled | | |
| 2021–22 | Banbury United (PDC); Peterborough Sports (PDC); Taunton Town (PDS); Farnborough (PDS) | 1st 2nd* 1st 3rd* | National League North; National League North; National League South; National League South |
| 2022–23 | Tamworth (PDC); Rushall Olympic (PDC); Weston-super-Mare (PDS); Truro City (PDS) | 1st 5th* 1st 3rd* | National League North; National League North; National League South; National League South |
| 2023–24 | Needham Market (PDC); Leamington (PDC); Chesham United (PDS); Salisbury (PDS) | 1st 3rd* 1st 3rd* | National League North; National League North; National League South; National League South |
| 2024–25 | Bedford Town (PDC); AFC Telford United (PDC); Merthyr Town (PDS); AFC Totton (PDS) | 1st 3rd* 1st 2nd* | National League North; National League North; National League North; National League South |
| 2025–26 | Harborough Town (PDC) Spalding United (PDC) Walton & Hersham (PDS) Farnham Town (PDS) | 1st 2rd* 1st 2nd* | National League North; National League North; National League South; National League South |

Asterisk indicates club was promoted via play-offs

== League Cup winners ==
| Season | Winners (Division) |
|---|---|
| 1932–33 | Plymouth Argyle Reserves (WD) |
| 1933–34 | Plymouth Argyle Reserves (WD) |
| 1934–35 | Folkestone (ED) |
| 1935–36 | Plymouth Argyle Reserves (WD) |
| 1936–37 | Newport County Reserves (SL) |
| 1937–38 | Colchester United (SL) |
| 1938–39 | Not completed |
| 1939–40 | Worcester City (WS) (war-time comp.) |
| 1941 to 1945 | Cancelled (World War 2) |
| 1945–46 | Chelmsford City (SL) |
| 1946–47 | Gillingham (SL) |
| 1947–48 | Merthyr Tydfil (SL) |
| 1948–49 | Yeovil Town SL) |
| 1949–50 | Colchester United (SL) |
| 1950–51 | Merthyr Tydfil (SL) |
| 1951–52 | Hereford United (SL) |
| 1952–53 | Headington United (SL) |
| 1953–54 | Headington United (SL) |
| 1954–55 | Yeovil Town (SL) |
| 1955–56 | Gloucester City (SL) |
| 1956–57 | Hereford United (SL) |
| 1957–58 | Cheltenham Town (SL) |
| 1958–59 | Hereford United (NW-D) |
| 1959–60 | Chelmsford City (PD) |
| 1960–61 | Yeovil Town (PD) |
| 1961–62 | Cambridge United (PD) |
| 1962–63 | Guildford City (PD) |
| 1963–64 | Burton Albion (D1) |
| 1964–65 | Cambridge United (PD) |
| 1965–66 | Yeovil Town (PD) |
| 1966–67 | Guildford City (PD) |
| 1967–68 | Margate (PD) |
| 1968–69 | Cambridge United (PD) |
| 1969–70 | Wimbledon (PD) |
| 1970–71 | Telford United (PD) |
| 1971–72 | Barnet (PD) |
| 1972–73 | Weymouth (PD) |
| 1973–74 | AP Leamington (D1N) |
| 1974–75 | Kettering Town (PD) |
| 1975–76 | Wimbledon (PD) |
| 1976–77 | Dartford (PD) |
| 1977–78 | Gravesend & Northfleet (PD) |
| 1978–79 | Bath City (PD) |
| 1979–80 | Kidderminster Harriers (MD) |
| 1980–81 | Bedford Town (MD) |
| 1981–82 | Wealdstone (MD) |
| 1982–83 | Alvechurch (PD) |
| 1983–84 | AP Leamington (PD) |
| 1984–85 | Fisher Athletic (PD) |
| 1985–86 | Bromsgrove Rovers (MD) |
| 1986–87 | Waterlooville (SD) |
| 1987–88 | Dartford (PD) |
| 1988–89 | Dartford (PD) |
| 1989–90 | VS Rugby (PD) |
| 1990–91 | Chelmsford City (PD) |
| 1991–92 | Dover Athletic (PD) |
| 1992–93 | Stourbridge (MD) |
| 1993–94 | Sudbury Town (SD) |
| 1994–95 | Hastings Town (PD) |
| 1995–96 | Nuneaton Borough (MD) |
| 1996–97 | Burton Albion (PD) |
| 1997–98 | Margate (SD) |
| 1998–99 | Sutton Coldfield Town (PD) |
| 1999–00 | Burton Albion (PD) |
| 2000–01 | Worcester City (PD) |
| 2001–02 | Dorchester Town (ED) |
| 2002–03 | Crawley Town (PD) |
| 2003–04 | Crawley Town (PD) |
| 2004–05 | King's Lynn (PD) |
| 2005–06 | Hitchin Town (PD) |
| 2006–07 | Tiverton Town (PD) |
| 2007–08 | Hillingdon Borough (PD) |
| 2008–09 | Atherstone Town (MD) |
| 2009–10 | Cambridge City (PD) |
| 2010–11 | Hednesford Town (PD) |
| 2011–12 | Clevedon Town (SW) |
| 2012–13 | Arlesey Town (PD) |
| 2013–14 | St Neots Town (PD) |
| 2014–15 | Poole Town (PD) |
| 2015–16 | Merthyr Town (PD) |
| 2016–17 | Hayes & Yeading United (PD) |
| 2017–18 | Hitchin Town (PD) |
| 2018–19 | Stratford Town (PDC) |
| 2019 to 2021 | Abandoned (COVID-19 pandemic) |
| 2021–22 | Royston Town (PDC) |
| 2022 onwards | Discontinued |

== League structure ==
The league structure has changed several times over the years and currently consists of the Premier Central and Premier South Divisions at step 3 of the National League System with Division One South and Division One Central at step 4.

Due in large part to the presence of the Isthmian League, the geographical footprint of the Southern League actually extends further north than the National League South. Therefore, while the winners of the Central and South Divisions are promoted to the National League South, those clubs in the most northerly locales are promoted to the National League North. In the past, the majority of the winners of the former Premier Division, together with the winners of a playoff, were promoted to the higher league.

Clubs relegated from the Southern League can theoretically be placed in any of fourteen lower-level leagues, but in practice it is likely to be one of the following (based on geography):

- Combined Counties League
- Hellenic League
- Midland Football League
- Spartan South Midlands League
- United Counties League
- Wessex League
- Western League

From time to time, clubs outside the promotion and relegation positions based at the geographical edges of the Southern League will be compelled to leave the League by the NLS Committee, should it be necessary for them to compete in the Northern Premier League or Isthmian League so as to correct any imbalances brought on by the geographical distribution of the clubs promoted and relegated to this level. Clubs in the Northern Premier League or Isthmian League have also been entered into the Southern League for the same reason. In general, there has been a drift southwards, with clubs in the Midlands moving into the Northern Premier League.

== See also ==
- Isthmian League
- Northern Premier League
