= Johnny Brooks =

English footballer (1931–2016)

Personal information
- Full name: John Brooks
- Date of birth: 23 December 1931
- Place of birth: Reading, England
- Date of death: 7 June 2016 (aged 84)
- Place of death: Bournemouth, England
- Height: 5 ft 10 in (1.78 m)
- Position: Inside forward

Youth career
- Coley Old Boys
- Mount Pleasant
- –1949: Castle Street Institute

Senior career*
Years	Team	Apps	(Gls)
1949–1953	Reading	46	(5)
1953–1959	Tottenham Hotspur	166	(46)
1959–1961	Chelsea	46	(6)
1961–1964	Brentford	83	(36)
1964	Crystal Palace	7	(0)
1964	Toronto City		
1964–1968	Stevenage Town	146	(36)
1968	Cleveland Stokers	22	(1)
1968–1969	Cambridge City	23	(0)
- Knebworth

International career
1956	England	3	(2)

Managerial career
- Knebworth
- * Club domestic league appearances and goals

John Brooks (23 December 1931 – 7 June 2016) was an English professional footballer who played for Reading, Tottenham Hotspur, Chelsea, Brentford, Crystal Palace in the Football League. Brooks won three England caps and scored two goals. and was the first Reading born England international. Towards the end of his career he played in non-League football with Stevenage Town and Cambridge City and in North America with Cleveland Stokers. He later player-managed Knebworth. Brooks' son Shaun also had a career in professional football.

== Club career ==
=== Reading ===
Brooks' career began as a youth at Coley Old Boys, Mount Pleasant, Castle Street Institute and he also represented Reading & Berkshire schoolboys. An inside forward, he began his senior club career at hometown Third Division South club Reading. Brooks joined the Royals in February 1949 as an amateur and signed a professional contract two months later. While with Reading, Brooks served his national service at Aldershot and represented the Army football team. He made 46 league appearances and scored five goals over the course of a three-year spell and helped the club to third and second-place finishes in the 1950–51 and 1951–52 seasons respectively. Brooks departed Elm Park in February 1953 and was posthumously inducted into the Reading Hall of Fame in 2018.

=== Tottenham Hotspur ===
After turning down moves to Newcastle United, Arsenal and West Ham United, Brooks joined First Division club Tottenham Hotspur in February 1953 for a £6,000 fee, with Dennis Uphill and Harry Robshaw moving to Reading. He later recalled that Tottenham had always been in his blood, after watching the 1949–50 Second Division and 1950–51 First Division championship triumphs on the terraces at White Hart Lane. After beginning his career with the club in the reserve team, Brooks made his first team debut in a 2–0 defeat to Stoke City on 6 April 1953, but it would prove to be his only appearance of the 1952–53 season.

By the 1954–55 season, Brooks had broken through into the first team and made 31 appearances, scoring seven goals. After the departure of manager Arthur Rowe in 1955, the best years of Brooks' Spurs career came under new manager Jimmy Anderson and he scored in double figures to help Tottenham to second and third-place finishes in the 1956–57 and 1957–58 seasons respectively. His performances also won him England recognition. A bust up with new manager Bill Nicholson after a 6–0 defeat to Wolverhampton Wanderers in 1958 was the beginning of the end of Brooks' time at White Hart Lane and he departed the club in December 1959. Brooks scored 51 goals in 179 appearances during his six and a half years with Tottenham.

=== Chelsea ===
Brooks joined First Division club Chelsea for a £20,000 fee in December 1959, with Les Allen moving to Tottenham Hotspur in exchange. The move reunited Brooks with his former Reading manager Ted Drake. He made 52 appearances and scored seven goals over the course of a spell which lasted until September 1961.

=== Brentford ===
Brooks signed for Chelsea's West London neighbours Brentford in September 1961 in a £5,000 deal. He made 38 league appearances and scored 10 goals over the course of a disastrous 1961–62 season in the Third Division, with a 23rd-place finish relegating the Bees to the Fourth Division for the 1962–63 season. In the Fourth Division, Brooks was the playmaker and inspired Brentford to the title, making 39 appearances, scoring 22 goals and winning the first club silverware of his career. He missed the final few games of the season after suffering a torn groin and his fitness troubles continued into the 1963–64 season, in which he scored four goals in six games before leaving the club. Brooks made 92 appearances and scored over 40 goals during his time at Griffin Park. Looking back in 2005, Brooks revealed "in many ways the two years I spent at Brentford were my happiest in the game".

=== Crystal Palace ===
Brooks joined Third Division club Crystal Palace in January 1964. He made just seven appearances for the club before departing at the end of the 1963–64 season, after the club's promotion to the Second Division was confirmed.

=== Toronto City ===
Brooks spurned the interest of Lincoln City and Aldershot and travelled to Canada in May 1964, to sign for Eastern Canada Professional Soccer League club Toronto City. Among his teammates at the club were Tony Book, Ted Purdon, Norman Sykes and player-manager Malcolm Allison.

=== Stevenage Town ===
Brooks returned to the UK in September 1964 and signed for Southern League club Stevenage Town, managed by George Curtis. In four seasons at Broadhall Way, he made more than 200 appearances and scored more than 50 goals. In addition to being part of two Hitchin Centenary Cup-winning squads, Brooks was part of the 1966–67 squad that achieved promotion from the First Division to the Premier Division.

=== Cleveland Stokers ===
Brooks returned to North America to play in the North American Soccer League with Cleveland Stokers in 1968. He made 22 appearances and scored one goal in his spell.

=== Return to non-League football ===
After his return to the UK in 1968, Brooks joined Southern League club Cambridge City. He later played for and managed Herts Senior County League club Knebworth well into his fifties. Brooks later coached the teams at Moordown Youth and served as president of Bournemouth.

== International career ==
Brooks' goalscoring for Tottenham Hotspur won him a call up to the England squad for a British Home Championship match versus Wales on 14 November 1956. He scored the second goal in a 3–1 victory. He was called up again for a friendly versus Yugoslavia two weeks later and again got on the scoresheet in a 3–0 win. Brooks' third and final cap came in a 5–2 1958 World Cup qualification win over Denmark on 5 December 1956.

== Personal life ==
Brooks was one of the earliest British footballers to endorse hair products, advertising Max Factor shampoo during the 1950s. Brooks' son Shaun was also a professional footballer and played for Leyton Orient, Crystal Palace, Bournemouth, was capped by England at schoolboy and youth level and managed Dorchester Town. After retiring from football, Brooks worked alongside friend and former teammate Tommy Harmer as a broker's messenger for Bank Hapoalim, until being made redundant at the age of 60. With the help of former teammate Micky Dulin, Brooks then became a park-keeper at Ridgeway Park in Chingford. Brooks retired and moved to Bournemouth in 1997. It was reported in 2014 that Brooks was suffering with vascular dementia and he died on 7 June 2016.

== Career statistics ==
Appearances and goals by club, season and competition
Club	Season	League			National cup (Note: Includes FA Cup)		League cup (Note: Includes Football League Cup, Southern League Cup)		Other		Total	
Club	Season	Division	Apps	Goals	Apps	Goals	Apps	Goals	Apps	Goals	Apps	Goals
Tottenham Hotspur	1952–53	First Division	1	0	0	0	—		—		1	0
Tottenham Hotspur	1953–54	First Division	18	2	0	0	—		—		18	2
Tottenham Hotspur	1954–55	First Division	31	7	3	4	—		—		34	11
Tottenham Hotspur	1955–56	First Division	39	10	6	1	—		—		45	11
Tottenham Hotspur	1956–57	First Division	23	11	0	0	—		—		23	11
Tottenham Hotspur	1957–58	First Division	25	10	1	0	—		—		26	10
Tottenham Hotspur	1958–59	First Division	25	4	3	0	—		—		28	4
Tottenham Hotspur	1959–60	First Division	4	2	—		—		—		4	2
Tottenham Hotspur	Total		166	46	13	5	—		—		179	51
Chelsea	1959–60	First Division	20	5	2	0	—		—		22	5
Chelsea	1960–61	First Division	26	1	0	0	4	1	—		30	2
Chelsea	Total		46	6	2	0	4	1	—		52	7
Brentford	1961–62	Third Division	38	10	5	1	0	0	—		43	11
Brentford	1962–63	Fourth Division	39	22	1	0	1	0	—		41	22
Brentford	1963–64	Third Division	6	4	0	0	2	0	—		8	4
Brentford	Total		83	36	6	1	3	0	—		92	37
Stevenage Town	1964–65	Southern League First Division	34	9	0	0	0	0	1 (Note: Appearance in East Anglian Cup)	0	35	9
Stevenage Town	1965–66	Southern League First Division	39	12	3	0	0	0	4 (Note: 3 appearances and 1 goal in East Anglian Cup, 1 appearance in Hitchin Centenary Cup)	1	46	13
Stevenage Town	1966–67	Southern League First Division	44	8	6	1	4	0	3 (Note: Appearances in Hitchin Centenary Cup)	0	57	9
Stevenage Town	1967–68	Southern League Premier Division	29	7	3	2	4	2	6 (Note: 5 appearances and 1 goal in East Anglian Cup, 1 appearance in Hitchin Centenary Cup)	1	42	12
Stevenage Town	Total		146	36	12	3	8	2	14	1	180	42
Cleveland Stokers	1968	North American Soccer League	22	1	—		—		—		22	1
Career total			463	125	32	9	15	3	14	1	524	138

== Honours ==
England

- British Home Championship: 1956–57

Brentford

- Football League Fourth Division: 1962–63

Crystal Palace

- Football League Third Division second-place promotion: 1963–64

Stevenage Town

- Southern League First Division promotion: 1966–67
- Hitchin Centenary Cup: 1965-66, 1966-67

Individual

- Reading Hall of Fame
