= 1951–52 Delphian League =

Delphian League
- Season: 1951–52
- Champions: Brentwood & Warley

The 1951–52 Delphian League season was the first in the history of the Delphian League. The league consisted of 14 teams.

The first matches were played on 18 August 1951 and the final matches were played on 3 May 1952.

== Teams ==
Team	Former league
Aylesbury United	Spartan League Premier Division
Berkhamsted Town	Spartan League Premier Division
Bishop's Stortford	Spartan League Division One East
Brentwood & Warley	Spartan League Premier Division
Cheshunt	London League Premier Division
Dagenham	Metropolitan & District League
Leatherhead	Metropolitan & District League
Rainham Town	London League Premier Division
Slough Centre	Spartan League Premier Division
Stevenage Town	Spartan League Division One East
Wembley	Spartan League Division One West
Willesden	Spartan League Premier Division
Woodford Town	London League Premier Division
Yiewsley	Spartan League Premier Division

== League table ==
Pos	Team	Pld	W	D	L	GF	GA	GD	Pts
1	Brentwood & Warley	26	16	4	6	65	37	+28	36
2	Dagenham	26	16	3	7	68	35	+33	35
3	Yiewsley	26	14	5	7	70	48	+22	33
4	Leatherhead	26	14	4	8	51	43	+8	32
5	Woodford Town	26	12	7	7	59	44	+15	31
6	Aylesbury United	26	12	6	8	67	40	+27	30
7	Rainham Town	26	13	3	10	41	43	−2	29
8	Slough Centre	26	10	6	10	58	61	−3	26
9	Willesden	26	10	3	13	48	50	−2	23
10	Bishop's Stortford	26	10	3	13	55	80	−25	23
11	Berkhamsted Town	26	9	3	14	47	58	−11	21
12	Stevenage Town	26	6	7	13	50	75	−25	19
13	Cheshunt	26	5	6	15	46	69	−23	16
14	Wembley	26	2	6	18	30	72	−42	10

Source: Non-League Matters

== Results ==
Home \ Away	AYL	BER	BIS	B&W	CHE	DAG	LEA	RAI	SLO	STE	WEM	WIL	WOO	YIE
Aylesbury United	—	2–1	5–1	1–2	0–2	3–3	2–1	5–0	6–0	2–2	3–3	3–1	2–2	1–1
Berkhamsted Town	2–0	—	4–1	1–3	2–1	1–4	1–0	2–3	3–5	4–0	4–3	1–2	1–2	1–1
Bishop's Stortford	3–1	5–0	—	2–2	3–1	2–1	2–1	3–0	2–6	2–2	3–2	3–2	3–2	3–7
Brentwood & Warley	1–0	3–1	8–3	—	1–1	2–1	2–3	4–1	3–2	6–0	4–0	5–0	2–3	4–0
Cheshunt	0–3	2–2	4–2	1–2	—	4–4	4–2	1–2	2–2	0–6	3–1	1–5	1–2	3–3
Dagenham	2–1	5–2	1–2	1–1	2–0	—	7–2	0–1	3–1	10–0	6–1	2–1	1–0	4–0
Leatherhead	3–1	4–1	1–1	1–1	6–3	1–0	—	1–0	2–3	4–1	3–0	3–1	1–0	1–1
Rainham Town	3–2	0–1	5–2	2–0	1–0	1–3	5–1	—	2–0	4–0	2–0	1–1	1–1	2–1
Slough Town F.C.	0–4	4–3	3–0	2–1	2–2	0–2	0–1	4–1	—	2–2	2–2	3–2	3–1	3–4
Stevenage Town	2–6	1–4	4–0	1–2	4–4	3–1	0–2	0–2	4–4	—	3–1	3–5	1–1	5–3
Wembley	1–1	1–3	5–3	0–1	0–6	1–2	0–1	2–2	1–1	2–2	—	0–4	0–5	1–0
Willesden	0–2	2–0	1–0	0–4	5–0	0–2	0–3	3–0	2–3	2–0	2–1	—	2–2	1–2
Woodford Town	3–6	3–1	7–3	2–0	5–1	0–1	1–1	2–0	5–3	0–3	3–2	1–1	—	4–2
Yiewsley	1–5	1–1	5–1	8–1	2–0	5–0	6–2	4–0	1–0	2–1	3–0	5–3	2–2	—

Legend: Blue = home team win; Yellow = draw; Red = away team win.

== See also ==
- Delphian League
- List of Delphian League seasons
