= 1965–66 Southern Football League =

English football competition

The 1965–66 Southern Football League season was the 63rd in the history of the league, an English football competition.

Weymouth won the championship for the second time in a row, whilst Barnet, Bath City, Burton Albion and Hillingdon Borough were all promoted to the Premier Division. Nine Southern League clubs applied to join the Football League at the end of the season, but none were successful.

== Premier Division ==
The Premier Division consisted of 22 clubs, including 18 clubs from the previous season and four new clubs, promoted from Division One:

- Corby Town
- Hereford United
- Poole Town
- Wimbledon

=== League table ===
Southern Football League Premier Division
- Season: 1965–66
- Champions: Weymouth
- Relegated: Dartford; Margate; Rugby Town; Tonbridge
- Matches: 462
- Goals: 1,548 (3.35 per match)

Pos	Team	Pld	W	D	L	GF	GA	GR	Pts	Promotion or relegation
1	Weymouth	42	22	13	7	70	35	2.000	57	
2	Chelmsford City	42	21	12	9	74	50	1.480	54	
3	Hereford United	42	21	10	11	81	49	1.653	52	
4	Bedford Town	42	23	6	13	80	57	1.404	52	
5	Wimbledon	42	20	10	12	80	47	1.702	50	
6	Cambridge City	42	19	11	12	67	52	1.288	49	
7	Romford	42	21	7	14	87	72	1.208	49	
8	Worcester City	42	20	8	14	69	54	1.278	48	
9	Yeovil Town	42	17	11	14	91	70	1.300	45	
10	Cambridge United	42	18	9	15	72	64	1.125	45	
11	King's Lynn	42	18	7	17	75	72	1.042	43	
12	Corby Town	42	16	9	17	66	73	0.904	41	
13	Wellington Town	42	13	13	16	65	70	0.929	39	
14	Nuneaton Borough	42	15	8	19	60	74	0.811	38	
15	Folkestone Town	42	14	9	19	53	75	0.707	37	
16	Guildford City	42	14	8	20	70	84	0.833	36	
17	Poole Town	42	14	7	21	61	75	0.813	35	
18	Cheltenham Town	42	13	9	20	69	99	0.697	35	
19	Dartford	42	13	7	22	62	69	0.899	33	Relegated to Division One
20	Rugby Town	42	11	10	21	67	95	0.705	32	Relegated to Division One
21	Tonbridge	42	11	6	25	63	101	0.624	28	Relegated to Division One
22	Margate	42	8	10	24	66	111	0.595	26	Relegated to Division One

Source: fchd.com rsssf.com
Rules for classification: 1) points; 2) goal ratio.

== Division One ==
Division One expanded up to 24 clubs, including 18 clubs from the previous season and six new clubs:

- Four clubs relegated from the Premier Division:
  - Bath City
  - Bexley United
  - Hastings United
  - Wisbech Town
- Plus:
  - Barnet, joined from the Athenian League
  - Dunstable Town, joined from the Metropolitan League

=== League table ===
Southern Football League Division One
- Season: 1965–66
- Champions: Barnet
- Promoted: Barnet; Bath City; Burton Albion; Hillingdon Borough
- Matches: 552
- Goals: 1,845 (3.34 per match)

Pos	Team	Pld	W	D	L	GF	GA	GR	Pts	Promotion or relegation
1	Barnet	46	30	9	7	114	49	2.327	69	Promoted to the Premier Division
2	Hillingdon Borough	46	27	10	9	101	46	2.196	64	Promoted to the Premier Division
3	Burton Albion	46	28	8	10	121	60	2.017	64	Promoted to the Premier Division
4	Bath City	46	25	13	8	88	50	1.760	63	Promoted to the Premier Division
5	Hastings United	46	25	10	11	104	59	1.763	60	
6	Wisbech Town	46	25	9	12	98	54	1.815	59	
7	Canterbury City	46	25	8	13	89	66	1.348	58	
8	Stevenage Town	46	23	9	14	86	49	1.755	55	
9	Kettering Town	46	22	9	15	77	74	1.041	53	
10	Merthyr Tydfil	46	22	6	18	95	68	1.397	50	
11	Dunstable Town	46	15	14	17	76	72	1.056	44	
12	Crawley Town	46	17	10	19	72	71	1.014	44	
13	Bexley United	46	20	4	22	65	71	0.915	44	
14	Trowbridge Town	46	16	11	19	79	81	0.975	43	
15	Dover	46	17	8	21	59	62	0.952	42	
16	Barry Town	46	16	10	20	72	94	0.766	42	
17	Gravesend & Northfleet	46	16	9	21	84	86	0.977	41	
18	Gloucester City	46	14	12	20	75	98	0.765	40	
19	Sittingbourne	46	11	12	23	77	121	0.636	34	
20	Ramsgate Athletic	46	9	15	22	35	76	0.461	33	
21	Hinckley Athletic	46	10	12	24	58	93	0.624	32	
22	Tunbridge Wells Rangers	46	12	8	26	47	88	0.534	32	
23	Ashford Town (Kent)	46	9	10	27	44	92	0.478	28	
24	Deal Town	46	3	4	39	29	165	0.176	10	Resigned from league

Source: fchd.com rsssf.com
Rules for classification: 1) points; 2) goal ratio.

== Football League elections ==
Alongside the four League clubs facing re-election, a total of 14 non-League clubs applied for election, including nine Southern League clubs. All four League clubs were re-elected.

Club	League	Votes
Lincoln City	Football League	43
Bradford City	Football League	42
Wrexham	Football League	40
Rochdale	Football League	40
Wigan Athletic	Cheshire League	5
Cambridge United	Southern League	5
Hereford United	Southern League	4
Bedford Town	Southern League	3
Romford	Southern League	2
Morecambe	Lancashire Combination	2
Corby Town	Southern League	1
Wellington Town	Southern League	1
Wimbledon	Southern League	0
Scarborough	Midland League	0
Yeovil Town	Southern League	0
Folkestone	Southern League	0
