= 1969–70 Southern Football League =

The 1969–70 Southern Football League season was the 67th in the history of the league, an English football competition.

Cambridge United won the championship, winning their second Southern League title in a row and were elected to the Football League, whilst Ashford Town (Kent), Bedford Town, Cambridge City, Dartford were all promoted to the Premier Division.

== Premier Division ==
The Premier Division consisted of 22 clubs, including 18 clubs from the previous season and four new clubs, promoted from Division One:

- Bath City
- Brentwood Town
- Crawley Town
- Gloucester City

Also, at the end of the previous season Wellington Town were renamed Telford United.

Cambridge United was elected to the Football League in place of Bradford Park Avenue. At the end of the season Brentwood Town resigned from the league after three seasons and folded. Thus, Gloucester City and Nuneaton Borough remained in the division.

=== League table ===
Southern Football League Premier Division
- Season: 1969–70
- Champions: Cambridge United
- Relegated: Burton Albion; Crawley Town
- Matches: 462
- Goals: 1,319 (2.85 per match)

Pos	Team	Pld	W	D	L	GF	GA	GR	Pts	Promotion or relegation
1	Cambridge United	42	26	6	10	84	50	1.680	58	Elected to the Football League Fourth Division
2	Yeovil Town	42	25	7	10	78	48	1.625	57	
3	Chelmsford City	42	20	11	11	76	58	1.310	51	
4	Weymouth	42	18	14	10	59	37	1.595	50	
5	Wimbledon	42	19	12	11	64	52	1.231	50	
6	Hillingdon Borough	42	19	12	11	56	50	1.120	50	
7	Barnet	42	16	15	11	71	54	1.315	47	
8	Telford United	42	18	10	14	61	62	0.984	46	
9	Brentwood Town	42	16	13	13	61	38	1.605	45	Club folded
10	Hereford United	42	18	9	15	74	65	1.138	45	
11	Bath City	42	18	8	16	63	55	1.145	44	
12	King's Lynn	42	16	11	15	72	68	1.059	43	
13	Margate	42	17	8	17	70	64	1.094	42	
14	Dover	42	15	10	17	51	50	1.020	40	
15	Kettering Town	42	18	3	21	64	75	0.853	39	
16	Worcester City	42	14	10	18	35	44	0.795	38	
17	Romford	42	13	11	18	50	62	0.806	37	
18	Poole Town	42	8	19	15	48	57	0.842	35	
19	Gloucester City	42	12	9	21	53	73	0.726	33	Reprieved from relegation
20	Nuneaton Borough	42	11	10	21	52	74	0.703	32	Reprieved from relegation
21	Crawley Town	42	6	15	21	53	101	0.525	27	Relegated to Division One
22	Burton Albion	42	3	9	30	24	82	0.293	15	Relegated to Division One

Source: fchd.com rsssf.com
Rules for classification: 1) points; 2) goal ratio.

== Division One ==
Division One consisted of 22 clubs, including 18 clubs from the previous season and four new clubs, relegated from the Premier Division:

- Bedford Town
- Cheltenham Town
- Guildford City
- Rugby Town

At the end of the season Wisbech Town resigned from the league and switched to the Eastern Counties Football League.

=== League table ===
Southern Football League Division One
- Season: 1969–70
- Champions: Bedford Town
- Promoted: Ashford Town (Kent); Bedford Town; Cambridge City; Dartford
- Matches: 462
- Goals: 1,440 (3.12 per match)

Pos	Team	Pld	W	D	L	GF	GA	GR	Pts	Promotion or relegation
1	Bedford Town	42	26	9	7	93	37	2.514	61	Promoted to Premier Division
2	Cambridge City	42	26	8	8	104	43	2.419	60	Promoted to Premier Division
3	Dartford	42	24	11	7	88	46	1.913	59	Promoted to Premier Division
4	Ashford Town (Kent)	42	19	16	7	71	43	1.651	54	Promoted to Premier Division
5	Rugby Town	42	20	10	12	82	66	1.242	50	
6	Trowbridge Town	42	20	8	14	72	65	1.108	48	
7	Hastings United	42	18	11	13	67	51	1.314	47	
8	Guildford City	42	19	9	14	68	58	1.172	47	
9	Banbury United	42	19	8	15	86	72	1.194	46	
10	Cheltenham Town	42	20	5	17	78	81	0.963	45	
11	Canterbury City	42	15	13	14	61	57	1.070	43	
12	Corby Town	42	14	15	13	58	54	1.074	43	
13	Folkestone	42	19	5	18	57	55	1.036	43	
14	Ramsgate Athletic	42	14	13	15	53	57	0.930	41	
15	Salisbury	42	12	14	16	47	53	0.887	38	
16	Gravesend & Northfleet	42	13	11	18	62	71	0.873	37	
17	Bexley United	42	10	11	21	58	76	0.763	31	
18	Dunstable Town	42	11	9	22	52	82	0.634	31	
19	Merthyr Tydfil	42	9	11	22	40	80	0.500	29	
20	Barry Town	42	11	6	25	39	76	0.513	28	
21	Wisbech Town	42	8	9	25	58	116	0.500	25	Resigned to the Eastern Counties League
22	Tonbridge	42	4	10	28	46	101	0.455	18	

Source: fchd.com rsssf.com
Rules for classification: 1) points; 2) goal ratio.

== Football League elections ==
Alongside the four League clubs facing re-election, a total of 13 non-League clubs applied for election, ten of which were Southern League clubs. Three League clubs were re-elected, and Cambridge United were elected.

Club	League	Votes
Darlington	Football League	47
Hartlepool	Football League	42
Cambridge United	Southern League	31
Newport County	Football League	31
Bradford Park Avenue	Football League	17
Wigan Athletic	Northern Premier League	3
Cambridge City	Southern League	2
Yeovil Town	Southern League	1
Bedford Town	Southern League	1
Hereford United	Southern League	1
Morecambe	Northern Premier League	1
Romford	Southern League	1
Boston United	Northern Premier League	0
Chelmsford City	Southern League	0
Hillingdon Borough	Southern League	0
Telford United	Southern League	0
Wimbledon	Southern League	0

== See also ==
- Southern Football League
- 1969–70 Northern Premier League
