= 1968–69 Southern Football League =

The 1968–69 Southern Football League season was the 66th in the history of the league, an English football competition.

Cambridge United won the championship, winning their first Southern League title, whilst Bath City, Brentwood Town, Crawley Town and Gloucester City were all promoted to the Premier Division. Twelve Southern League clubs applied to join the Football League at the end of the season, but none were successful.

== Premier Division ==
The Premier Division consisted of 22 clubs, including 18 clubs from the previous season and four new clubs, promoted from Division One:

- Bedford Town
- Kettering Town
- Rugby Town
- Worcester City

At the end of the season Wellington Town were renamed Telford United.

=== League table ===
Southern Football League Premier Division
- Season: 1968–69
- Champions: Cambridge United
- Relegated: Bedford Town; Cheltenham Town; Guildford City; Rugby Town
- Matches: 462
- Goals: 1,325 (2.87 per match)

Pos	Team	Pld	W	D	L	GF	GA	GR	Pts	Promotion or relegation
1	Cambridge United	42	27	5	10	72	39	1.846	59	
2	Hillingdon Borough	42	24	10	8	68	47	1.447	58	
3	Wimbledon	42	21	12	9	66	48	1.375	54	
4	King's Lynn	42	20	9	13	68	60	1.133	49	
5	Worcester City	42	19	11	12	53	47	1.128	49	
6	Romford	42	18	12	12	58	52	1.115	48	
7	Weymouth	42	16	15	11	52	41	1.268	47	
8	Yeovil Town	42	16	13	13	52	50	1.040	45	
9	Kettering Town	42	18	8	16	51	55	0.927	44	
10	Dover	42	17	9	16	66	61	1.082	43	
11	Nuneaton Borough	42	17	7	18	74	58	1.276	41	
12	Barnet	42	15	10	17	72	66	1.091	40	
13	Chelmsford City	42	17	6	19	56	58	0.966	40	
14	Hereford United	42	15	9	18	66	62	1.065	39	
15	Wellington Town	42	14	10	18	62	61	1.016	38	
16	Poole Town	42	16	6	20	75	76	0.987	38	
17	Burton Albion	42	16	5	21	55	71	0.775	37	
18	Margate	42	14	7	21	79	90	0.878	35	
19	Cheltenham Town	42	15	5	22	55	64	0.859	35	Relegated to Division One
20	Bedford Town	42	11	12	19	46	63	0.730	34	Relegated to Division One
21	Rugby Town	42	10	6	26	38	83	0.458	26	Relegated to Division One
22	Guildford City	42	7	11	24	41	73	0.562	25	Relegated to Division One

Source: fchd.com rsssf.com
Rules for classification: 1) points; 2) goal ratio.

== Division One ==
Division One consisted of 22 clubs, including 18 clubs from the previous season and four new clubs:

- Three clubs relegated from the Premier Division:
  - Cambridge City
  - Corby Town
  - Hastings United
- Plus:
  - Salisbury, joined from the Western Football League

Also, at the end of the previous season Folkestone Town was renamed Folkestone.

=== League table ===
Southern Football League Division One
- Season: 1968–69
- Champions: Brentwood Town
- Promoted: Bath City; Brentwood Town; Crawley Town; Gloucester City
- Matches: 462
- Goals: 1,485 (3.21 per match)

Pos	Team	Pld	W	D	L	GF	GA	GR	Pts	Promotion or relegation
1	Brentwood Town	42	26	12	4	94	37	2.541	64	Promoted to the Premier Division
2	Bath City	42	26	10	6	96	40	2.400	62	Promoted to the Premier Division
3	Gloucester City	42	25	9	8	100	53	1.887	59	Promoted to the Premier Division
4	Crawley Town	42	21	13	8	65	32	2.031	55	Promoted to the Premier Division
5	Corby Town	42	22	6	14	81	65	1.246	50	
6	Dartford	42	20	8	14	79	51	1.549	48	
7	Ramsgate Athletic	42	19	9	14	72	57	1.263	47	
8	Salisbury	42	20	6	16	69	52	1.327	46	
9	Cambridge City	42	18	10	14	73	63	1.159	46	
10	Trowbridge Town	42	15	14	13	70	60	1.167	44	
11	Banbury United	42	16	12	14	67	72	0.931	44	
12	Folkestone	42	19	5	18	53	59	0.898	43	
13	Canterbury City	42	17	7	18	67	63	1.063	41	
14	Ashford Town (Kent)	42	16	8	18	72	73	0.986	40	
15	Bexley United	42	15	9	18	64	75	0.853	39	
16	Hastings United	42	15	9	18	58	69	0.841	39	
17	Wisbech Town	42	11	13	18	57	70	0.814	35	
18	Dunstable Town	42	14	6	22	73	99	0.737	34	
19	Merthyr Tydfil	42	10	7	25	49	101	0.485	27	
20	Barry Town	42	8	10	24	39	78	0.500	26	
21	Gravesend & Northfleet	42	8	9	25	51	79	0.646	25	
22	Tonbridge	42	2	6	34	36	137	0.263	10	

Source: fchd.com rsssf.com
Rules for classification: 1) points; 2) goal ratio.

== Football League elections ==
Alongside the four League clubs facing re-election, a total of 10 non-League clubs applied for election, all of which were Southern League clubs. All four League clubs were re-elected.

Club	League	Votes
Grimsby Town	Football League	47
York City	Football League	45
Bradford Park Avenue	Football League	38
Newport County	Football League	27
Cambridge United	Southern League	16
Kettering Town	Southern League	3
Cambridge City	Southern League	2
Hereford United	Southern League	2
Romford	Southern League	2
Bedford Town	Southern League	1
Chelmsford City	Southern League	1
Worcester City	Southern League	1
Nuneaton Borough	Southern League	0
Wimbledon	Southern League	0

== See also ==
- Southern Football League
- 1968–69 Northern Premier League
