= Robshaw =

Robshaw is an English surname, and may refer to one of the following:

- Chris Robshaw (born 1986), English rugby union player
- Harry Robshaw (1927–1990), English professional footballer
- Matt Robshaw, British cryptographer

== See also ==
- Robert Shaw (disambiguation)
