= 1967–68 Southern Football League =

The 1967–68 Southern Football League season was the 65th in the history of the league, an English football competition.

Chelmsford City won the championship, winning their second Southern League title, whilst Bedford Town, Kettering Town, Rugby Town and Worcester City were all promoted to the Premier Division. Twelve Southern League clubs applied to join the Football League at the end of the season, but none were successful.

== Premier Division ==
The Premier Division consisted of 22 clubs, including 18 clubs from the previous season and four new clubs, promoted from Division One:

- Dover
- Hastings United
- Margate
- Stevenage Town

At the end of the season Stevenage Town left the league and folded, thus Burton Albion Albion were reprieved from relegation.

=== League table ===
Southern Football League Premier Division
- Season: 1967–68
- Champions: Chelmsford City
- Relegated: Cambridge City; Corby Town; Hastings United
- Matches: 462
- Goals: 1,388 (3 per match)

Pos	Team	Pld	W	D	L	GF	GA	GR	Pts	Promotion or relegation
1	Chelmsford City	42	25	7	10	85	50	1.700	57	
2	Wimbledon	42	24	7	11	85	47	1.809	55	
3	Cambridge United	42	20	13	9	73	42	1.738	53	
4	Cheltenham Town	42	23	7	12	97	67	1.448	53	
5	Guildford City	42	18	13	11	56	43	1.302	49	
6	Romford	42	20	8	14	72	60	1.200	48	
7	Barnet	42	20	8	14	81	71	1.141	48	
8	Margate	42	19	8	15	80	71	1.127	46	
9	Wellington Town	42	16	13	13	70	66	1.061	45	
10	Hillingdon Borough	42	18	9	15	53	54	0.981	45	
11	King's Lynn	42	18	8	16	66	57	1.158	44	
12	Yeovil Town	42	16	12	14	45	43	1.047	44	
13	Weymouth	42	17	8	17	65	61	1.066	42	
14	Hereford United	42	17	7	18	58	62	0.935	41	
15	Nuneaton Borough	42	13	14	15	62	64	0.969	40	
16	Dover	42	17	6	19	54	56	0.964	40	
17	Poole Town	42	13	10	19	55	74	0.743	36	
18	Stevenage Town	42	13	9	20	57	75	0.760	35	Club folded
19	Burton Albion	42	14	6	22	51	73	0.699	34	Reprieved from relegation
20	Corby Town	42	7	13	22	40	77	0.519	27	Relegated to Division One
21	Cambridge City	42	10	6	26	50	81	0.617	26	Relegated to Division One
22	Hastings United	42	4	8	30	33	94	0.351	16	Relegated to Division One

Source: fchd.com rsssf.com
Rules for classification: 1) points; 2) goal ratio.

== Division One ==
After three clubs left the league at the end of the previous season, Division One reverted to 22-clubs format, including 17 clubs from the previous season and five new clubs:

- Four clubs relegated from the Premier Division:
  - Bath City
  - Bedford Town
  - Folkestone Town
  - Worcester City
- Plus:
  - Brentwood Town, joined from the Metropolitan League

At the end of the season Folkestone Town was renamed Folkestone.

=== League table ===
Southern Football League Division One
- Season: 1967–68
- Champions: Worcester City
- Promoted: Bedford Town; Kettering Town; Rugby Town; Worcester City
- Matches: 462
- Goals: 1,438 (3.11 per match)

Pos	Team	Pld	W	D	L	GF	GA	GR	Pts	Promotion or relegation
1	Worcester City	42	23	14	5	93	35	2.657	60	Promoted to the Premier Division
2	Kettering Town	42	24	10	8	88	39	2.256	58	Promoted to the Premier Division
3	Bedford Town	42	24	7	11	101	40	2.525	55	Promoted to the Premier Division
4	Rugby Town	42	20	15	7	72	44	1.636	55	Promoted to the Premier Division
5	Dartford	42	23	9	10	72	48	1.500	55	
6	Bath City	42	21	12	9	78	51	1.529	54	
7	Banbury United	42	22	9	11	79	59	1.339	53	
8	Ramsgate Athletic	42	17	17	8	70	37	1.892	51	
9	Merthyr Tydfil	42	18	13	11	80	66	1.212	49	
10	Tonbridge	42	18	9	15	76	71	1.070	45	
11	Canterbury City	42	16	11	15	66	63	1.048	43	
12	Ashford Town (Kent)	42	18	6	18	73	79	0.924	42	
13	Brentwood Town	42	16	9	17	63	73	0.863	41	
14	Bexley United	42	12	13	17	56	64	0.875	37	
15	Trowbridge Town	42	12	11	19	64	71	0.901	35	
16	Gloucester City	42	12	9	21	54	68	0.794	33	
17	Wisbech Town	42	11	10	21	43	78	0.551	32	
18	Crawley Town	42	10	8	24	53	85	0.624	28	
19	Folkestone Town	42	10	7	25	49	80	0.613	27	
20	Dunstable Town	42	8	10	24	44	94	0.468	26	
21	Barry Town	42	7	12	23	36	81	0.444	26	
22	Gravesend & Northfleet	42	6	7	29	28	112	0.250	19	

Source: fchd.com rsssf.com
Rules for classification: 1) points; 2) goal ratio.

== Football League elections ==
Alongside the four League clubs facing re-election, a total of 15 non-League clubs applied for election, including twelve Southern League clubs. All four League clubs were re-elected.

Club	League	Votes
York City	Football League	46
Chester	Football League	44
Bradford Park Avenue	Football League	44
Workington	Football League	38
Cheltenham Town	Southern League	3
Bedford Town	Southern League	2
Cambridge City	Southern League	2
Cambridge United	Southern League	2
Chelmsford City	Southern League	2
Runcorn	Cheshire League	2
Wigan Athletic	Cheshire League	2
Guildford City	Southern League	1
Hereford United	Southern League	1
New Brighton	Cheshire League	1
Wellington Town	Southern League	1
Wimbledon	Southern League	1
Worcester City	Southern League	1
Yeovil Town	Southern League	0
Nuneaton Borough	Southern League	0
