= John Standing (footballer) =

English footballer

Personal information
- Full name: John Robert Standing
- Date of birth: 3 September 1943 (age 83)
- Place of birth: Walberton, England
- Height: 5 ft 8 in (1.73 m)
- Position: Right back

Senior career*
Years	Team	Apps	(Gls)
19??–1961	Bognor Regis Town	0	(0)
1961–1962	Brighton & Hove Albion	10	(0)
1962–1968	Stevenage Town		
1968–1970	Crawley Town		
1970–197?	Hastings United		

Managerial career
- 1974–197?: Newhaven
- Haywards Heath Town
- * Club domestic league appearances and goals

John Robert Standing (born 3 September 1943) is an English former professional footballer who played as a right back in the Football League for Brighton & Hove Albion. He also played non-league football for Bognor Regis Town, Stevenage Town, Crawley Town and Hastings United, and managed Newhaven and Haywards Heath Town.
