= Delphian League Cup =

Football tournament in England

- Founded: 1975; 51 years ago
- Abolished: 1963; 63 years ago
- Region: England

The Delphian League Cup was a football knock-out cup competition organised by the Delphian League in England.

== History ==
The Delphian League was founded in 1951, but the accompanying cup competition - open to all teams in the league - did not begin until 1956. It was contested every season until league's dissolution at the end of 1962-63, with the exception of 1958-59, when no competition was held. Games were contested on a one-off basis, with replays held if the initial game ended in a draw. The final initially followed the same format, but was held on a two-legged basis in 1961-62 and 1962-63.

== Winners ==
Season	Winner	Runner-up
1956-57	Dagenham	Ware
1957-58	Rainham	Hornchurch & Upminster
1958-59	Competition not played	
1959-60	Stevenage	Aylesbury United
1960-61	Brentwood & Warley	Bishop's Stortford
1961-62	Aveley	Hemel Hempstead Town
1962-63	Hertford Town	Berkhamsted Town

== See also ==
- Delphian League
- List of Delphian League seasons
