= Albert Wetton =

English footballer

Personal information
- Full name: Albert Smailes Wetton
- Date of birth: 23 October 1928
- Place of birth: Winlaton, England
- Date of death: 17 December 1996 (aged 68)
- Place of death: Enfield, England
- Position: Utility player

Senior career*
Years	Team	Apps	(Gls)
- Dartford
19??–1949	Cheshunt		
1949–1951	Tottenham Hotspur	0	(0)
1951–1953	Brighton & Hove Albion	3	(0)
1953–1954	Crewe Alexandra	2	(0)
1954–195?	Gravesend & Northfleet		
1957–19??	Haywards Heath		
- * Club domestic league appearances and goals

Albert Smailes Wetton (23 October 1928 – 17 December 1996) was an English professional footballer who played as a centre half in the Football League for Brighton & Hove Albion and Crewe Alexandra. He was on the books of Tottenham Hotspur without playing for their first team, and also played non-league football for clubs including Cheshunt, Gravesend & Northfleet and Haywards Heath.

Wetton's brother, Ralph, played professional football for Tottenham Hotspur, Plymouth Argyle and Aldershot.
