= Wetton =

Wetton may refer to:

== People with the surname ==
- John Wetton (1949–2017), bass guitarist and singer-songwriter
- Hilary Davan Wetton (born 1943), British conductor
- Ralph Wetton (born 1927), English footballer

== Places ==
- Wetton, Staffordshire, a village in England
- Wetton, Cape Town, a suburb of Cape Town, South Africa
