= 1966–67 Southern Football League =

The 1966–67 Southern Football League season was the 64th in the history of the league, an English football competition.

Romford won the championship, winning their first Southern League title, whilst Barnet, Bath City, Burton Albion and Hillingdon Borough were all promoted to the Premier Division. Twelve Southern League clubs applied to join the Football League at the end of the season, but none were successful.

== Premier Division ==
The Premier Division consisted of 22 clubs, including 18 clubs from the previous season and four new clubs, promoted from Division One:

- Barnet
- Bath City
- Burton Albion
- Hillingdon Borough

=== League table ===
Southern Football League Premier Division
- Season: 1966–67
- Champions: Romford
- Relegated: Bath City; Bedford Town; Folkestone Town; Worcester City
- Matches: 462
- Goals: 1,457 (3.15 per match)

Pos	Team	Pld	W	D	L	GF	GA	GR	Pts	Promotion or relegation
1	Romford	42	22	8	12	80	60	1.333	52	
2	Nuneaton Borough	42	21	9	12	82	54	1.519	51	
3	Weymouth	42	18	14	10	64	40	1.600	50	
4	Wimbledon	42	19	11	12	88	60	1.467	49	
5	Barnet	42	18	13	11	86	66	1.303	49	
6	Guildford City	42	19	10	13	65	51	1.275	48	
7	Wellington Town	42	20	7	15	70	67	1.045	47	
8	Cambridge United	42	16	13	13	75	67	1.119	45	
9	Chelmsford City	42	15	15	12	66	59	1.119	45	
10	King's Lynn	42	15	14	13	78	72	1.083	44	
11	Hereford United	42	16	12	14	79	61	1.295	44	
12	Cambridge City	42	15	13	14	66	70	0.943	43	
13	Cheltenham Town	42	16	11	15	60	71	0.845	43	
14	Yeovil Town	42	14	14	14	66	72	0.917	42	
15	Burton Albion	42	17	5	20	63	71	0.887	39	
16	Corby Town	42	15	9	18	60	75	0.800	39	
17	Poole Town	42	14	11	17	52	65	0.800	39	
18	Hillingdon Borough	42	11	13	18	49	70	0.700	35	
19	Bath City	42	11	12	19	51	74	0.689	34	Relegated to Division One
20	Worcester City	42	11	8	23	59	79	0.747	30	Relegated to Division One
21	Bedford Town	42	8	13	21	54	72	0.750	29	Relegated to Division One
22	Folkestone Town	42	6	15	21	44	81	0.543	27	Relegated to Division One

Source: fchd.com rsssf.com
Rules for classification: 1) points; 2) goal ratio.

== Division One ==
Division One consisted of 24 clubs, including 19 clubs from the previous season and five new clubs:

- Four clubs relegated from the Premier Division:
  - Dartford
  - Margate
  - Rugby Town
  - Tonbridge
- Plus:
  - Banbury United, joined from the West Midlands (Regional) League

At the end of the season Hinckley Athletic and Sittingbourne resigned from the Southern Football League, while Tunbridge Wells Rangers folded.

=== League table ===
Southern Football League Division One
- Season: 1966–67
- Champions: Dover
- Promoted: Dover; Hastings United; Margate; Stevenage Town
- Matches: 552
- Goals: 1,784 (3.23 per match)

Pos	Team	Pld	W	D	L	GF	GA	GR	Pts	Promotion or relegation
1	Dover	46	29	12	5	92	35	2.629	70	Promoted to the Premier Division
2	Hastings United	46	31	7	8	127	54	2.352	69	Promoted to the Premier Division
3	Margate	46	29	8	9	90	32	2.813	66	Promoted to the Premier Division
4	Stevenage Town	46	25	16	5	89	45	1.978	66	Promoted to the Premier Division
5	Kettering Town	46	27	9	10	105	62	1.694	63	
6	Crawley Town	46	26	8	12	81	48	1.688	60	
7	Ramsgate Athletic	46	23	8	15	79	62	1.274	54	
8	Dartford	46	19	15	12	92	67	1.373	53	
9	Tonbridge	46	21	10	15	91	69	1.319	52	
10	Trowbridge Town	46	20	12	14	73	60	1.217	52	
11	Ashford Town (Kent)	46	18	8	20	74	68	1.088	44	
12	Merthyr Tydfil	46	17	9	20	81	71	1.141	43	
13	Gloucester City	46	18	6	22	69	83	0.831	42	
14	Canterbury City	46	17	8	21	57	75	0.760	42	
15	Wisbech Town	46	16	9	21	87	93	0.935	41	
16	Bexley United	46	13	15	18	53	69	0.768	41	
17	Banbury United	46	13	14	19	88	100	0.880	40	
18	Rugby Town	46	15	7	24	57	77	0.740	37	
19	Dunstable Town	46	14	6	26	55	87	0.632	34	
20	Barry Town	46	11	11	24	62	89	0.697	33	
21	Gravesend & Northfleet	46	11	9	26	63	106	0.594	31	
22	Hinckley Athletic	46	10	8	28	44	100	0.440	28	Resigned to the West Midlands (Regional) League
23	Tunbridge Wells Rangers	46	4	15	27	31	96	0.323	23	Club folded
24	Sittingbourne	46	5	10	31	44	136	0.324	20	Resigned to the Kent League

Source: fchd.com rsssf.com
Rules for classification: 1) points; 2) goal ratio.

== Football League elections ==
Alongside the four League clubs facing re-election, a total of 14 non-League clubs applied for election, including twelve Southern League clubs. All four League clubs were re-elected.

Club	League	Votes
Lincoln City	Football League	46
Bradford Park Avenue	Football League	45
York City	Football League	45
Rochdale	Football League	38
Wigan Athletic	Cheshire League	5
Romford	Southern League	5
Hereford United	Southern League	4
Bedford Town	Southern League	2
Cambridge United	Southern League	2
Chelmsford City	Southern League	1
Wellington Town	Southern League	1
Wimbledon	Southern League	1
Yeovil Town	Southern League	1
Cambridge City	Southern League	0
Corby Town	Southern League	0
Guildford City	Southern League	0
Kettering Town	Southern League	0
Scarborough	Midland League	0
