= Omer Riza =

Association football coach and former player

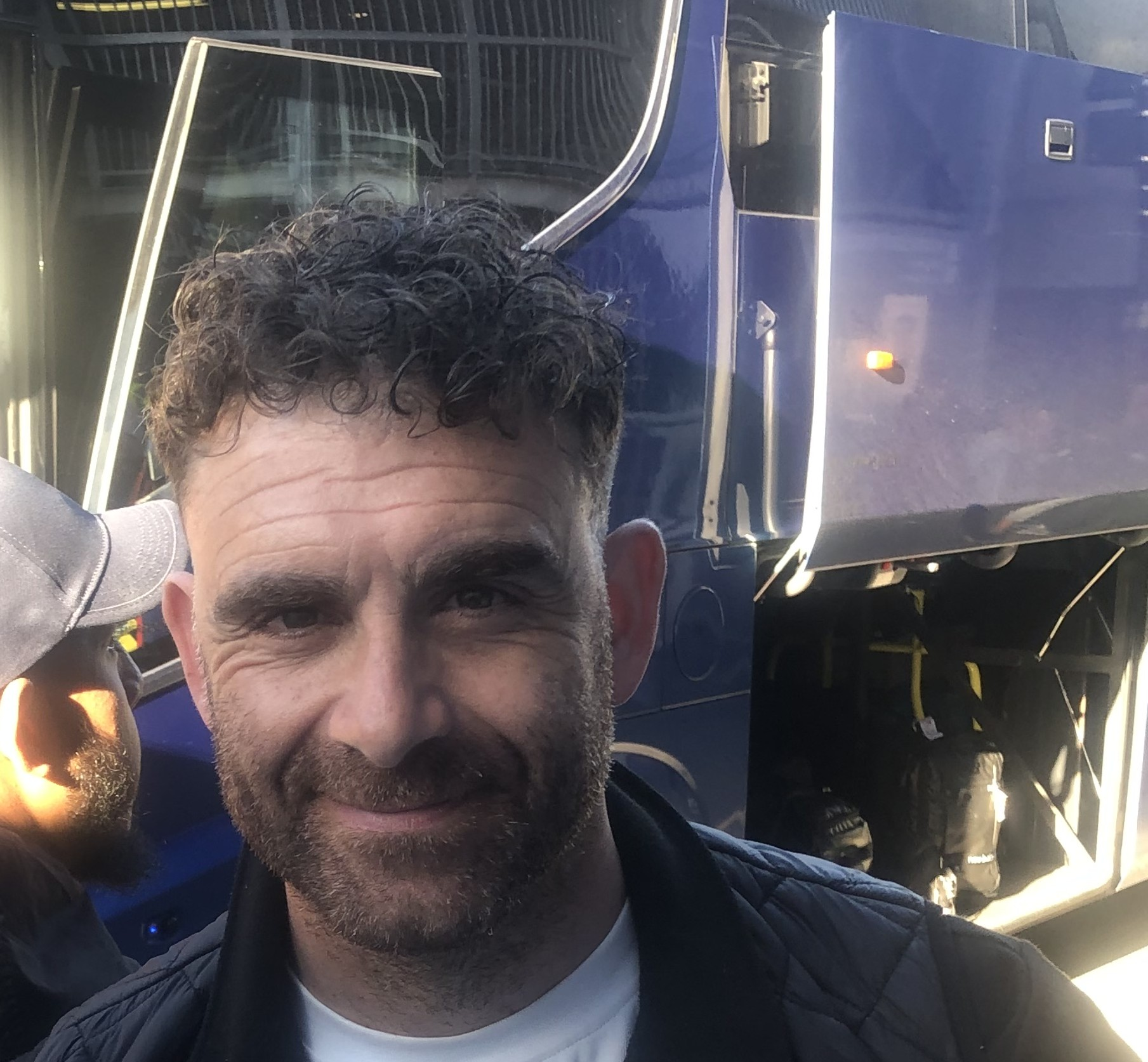
- Riza in 2025

Personal information
- Full name: Omer Karime Ali Riza
- Date of birth: 8 November 1979 (age 47)
- Place of birth: Edmonton, England
- Height: 5 ft 9 in (1.75 m)
- Position: Forward

Team information
- Current team: Cesena (assistant coach)

Youth career
- 1995–1998: Arsenal

Senior career*
Years	Team	Apps	(Gls)
1998–1999	Arsenal	0	(0)
1999	→ ADO Den Haag (loan)	11	(3)
1999–2002	West Ham United	0	(0)
2000	→ Barnet (loan)	5	(2)
2000–2001	→ Barnet (loan)	5	(2)
2001	→ Cambridge United (loan)	12	(3)
2002–2003	Cambridge United	46	(12)
2003–2006	Denizlispor	60	(16)
2006–2008	Trabzonspor	35	(4)
2009–2010	Shrewsbury Town	13	(0)
2010	Aldershot Town	1	(0)
2010–2012	Histon	55	(16)
2012–2013	Boreham Wood	19	(9)
2013	Chelmsford City	13	(2)
2013–2014	Cheshunt	19	(11)
2015	Harlow Town	0	(0)
2017–2018	Newmarket Town	5	(1)
2022	Hertford Town	3	(1)
Total		271	(70)

International career
2005	Turkey A2	1	(0)

Managerial career
- 2013–2014: Cheshunt
- 2017: Leyton Orient
- 2024–2025: Cardiff City
- * Club domestic league appearances and goals as of 12:11, 22 September 2024 (UTC)

Omer Karime Ali Riza (born 8 November 1979) is a football coach and former player who is assistant coach of Serie B club Cesena.

A forward, Riza signed for Arsenal and West Ham United, making one substitute appearance for Arsenal in the League Cup only. He played in the fourth tier of English football for Barnet, Cambridge United, Shrewsbury Town and Aldershot Town. Abroad, he featured for ADO Den Haag in the Netherlands and Turkish clubs Denizlispor and Trabzonspor. Born in England, Riza was capped for the Turkey A2 national team.

In his coaching career, Riza was head coach of Leyton Orient in 2017 and was appointed interim manager at Cardiff City in 2024. Later, he was given the role on a contract until the end of the 2024–25 season, before getting sacked in April 2025. He also held numerous roles in a five-year spell at Watford.

== Club career ==
=== Arsenal ===
Born in Edmonton, London, of Turkish Cypriot descent, Riza started his career as a youth with English club Arsenal. He made his only appearance for the club on 28 October 1998 in the League Cup third round, a 2–1 win away to Derby County in which he came on in the last minute as a substitute for Christopher Wreh. Riza said in 2018 that he believed he should have played more, due to his form for the under-19 and reserve teams; he said that although Nicolas Anelka, Ian Wright and Dennis Bergkamp were first-team forwards for Arsenal, players that he considered inferior to himself such as Kaba Diawara, Fabián Caballero and Wreh were getting more opportunities.

During the 1998–99 season, Riza went on loan to ADO Den Haag for three months.

=== Turkey and Football League ===
In the 1999–2000 season, Riza moved to West Ham United, but again was unable to break into the first team. He went on loan to Barnet and Cambridge United, and signed a permanent deal with the latter in 2002.

Riza went on trial at Aberdeen in July 2002. He scored the equaliser in a 4–4 pre-season friendly against nearby part-time club Brechin City, but was passed over by manager Ebbe Skovdahl for being too much like their player Darren Mackie.

During the 2002–03 season he scored 17 goals for Cambridge, which prompted a move to Süper Lig side Denizlispor during the 2003 close season. In January 2006, he signed for Trabzonspor. In January 2008, Riza walked out of the club, claiming he had not been paid. The Turkish Football Federation banned him from playing for any club.

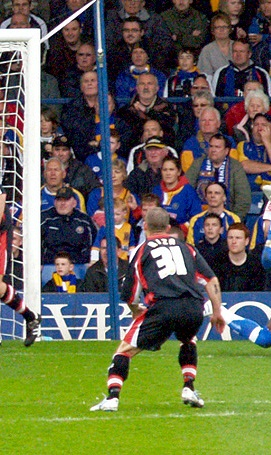
Riza playing for Shrewsbury Town in 2009.

In February 2009, Riza returned to English football with a trial at League Two club Shrewsbury Town, and impressed manager Paul Simpson, but Riza could not take part in any official matches due to the ban imposed upon him by the TFF. His legal representatives submitted a case to football's World governing body FIFA in early April 2009, from which a Swiss judge over-ruled the TFF decision, on 17 April, that Riza shall be allowed to compete in English football. Riza made his debut for Shrewsbury Town as a second-half substitute against Rotherham United the following day. He made five appearances that season, ending on 23 May in the 1–0 loss to Gillingham in the 2009 Football League Two play-off final, in which he came on for Nick Chadwick with 11 minutes of regulation time remaining.

On 22 January 2010, Riza left Shrewsbury Town after struggling to break into the first team during the first half of the season, with player and club coming to an agreement regarding paying off the rest of his contract. On 25 February, he joined Aldershot Town until the end of the season.

=== Non-league ===
Following the appointment of David Livermore as manager at Histon, Riza joined Histon on a non-contract basis and made his debut against Kettering Town in a Conference National fixture on 28 August 2010. He scored his first goal via a penalty in their league match against Hayes & Yeading United, which turned out to be the winning goal. Due to the cost of his wages, Histon released Riza in January 2012, giving him seven days notice to leave the club.

In February 2012, Riza signed for Boreham Wood scoring on his debut in a 3–0 win against Maidenhead United. On 28 January 2013, he signed for Chelmsford City and scored on his debut on the same day against Dorchester Town in a 4–0 win, being named Man of the Match.

In August 2015, Riza signed for Harlow Town, hoping to bounce back from a knee injury.

In December 2017, Riza came out of retirement, signing for Eastern Counties League Premier Division side Newmarket Town as a player. One month later, Riza left Newmarket due to injury.

On 1 January 2022, 42-year-old Riza played for Hertford Town in the Southern Football League.

== International career ==
Despite being born in England, Riza made one appearance for the Turkey A2 national team on 6 September 2005 during a 1–1 draw against Germany B during the 2005 Future Cup.

== Coaching career ==
In August 2013, Riza moved clubs again, this time signing for Cheshunt. Following the departure of manager Tony Faulkner, Riza was appointed as caretaker manager of Cheshunt. The holder of a UEFA A Licence badge, Riza said of his new role: "It's new to me but I am ready for the challenge. I am ready for the next step of my career. I have always wanted to go into this side of the game. I feel quietly confident I have what it takes to build something." His first game in charge was on 31 August 2013, an away game against Hertford Town in the FA Cup. Riza scored to make the game 3–1 before they finally lost 4–2. His player-manager position was made permanent in November 2013. He scored 17 goals during that season, but damaged his cruciate ligament in one of his knees in a charity match for Arsenal XI in June 2014, sidelining him for 15 months. He was sacked from his Cheshunt duties in September 2014.

He had a short spell as assistant manager for Heybridge Swifts, between December 2014 and February 2015.

On 30 March 2017, following the resignation of Daniel Webb as manager of Leyton Orient, Riza was promoted from his role as assistant manager and placed in charge until the end of the 2016–17 season. In his first game as manager, on 1 April, Orient lost 0–2 to Wycombe Wanderers and Riza was sent to the stands for verbally abusing referee Charles Breakspear. Three weeks later, after losing to Crewe Alexandra, Orient were relegated to the National League, ending the club's 112 years in the Football League. Riza's contract expired on 30 June 2017 and was not extended.

In August 2018, Riza joined Watford as an academy coach. In September 2019, Riza was named as a coach for the England U16s as part of The FA's 2019–20 Elite Coach Placement Programme. In October 2020, he was confirmed as the Watford's under-23 coach, having stepped up temporarily into the role in December 2019 after Hayden Mullins was promoted to the club's first-team staff.

On 26 August 2021, Riza was confirmed as an assistant coach for the England U17s, working with Tom Curtis and Paul Davis.

In June 2023, Riza was promoted to first-team coach at Watford under head coach Valérien Ismaël. He and fellow assistant Dean Whitehead left upon the Frenchman's sacking in March 2024.

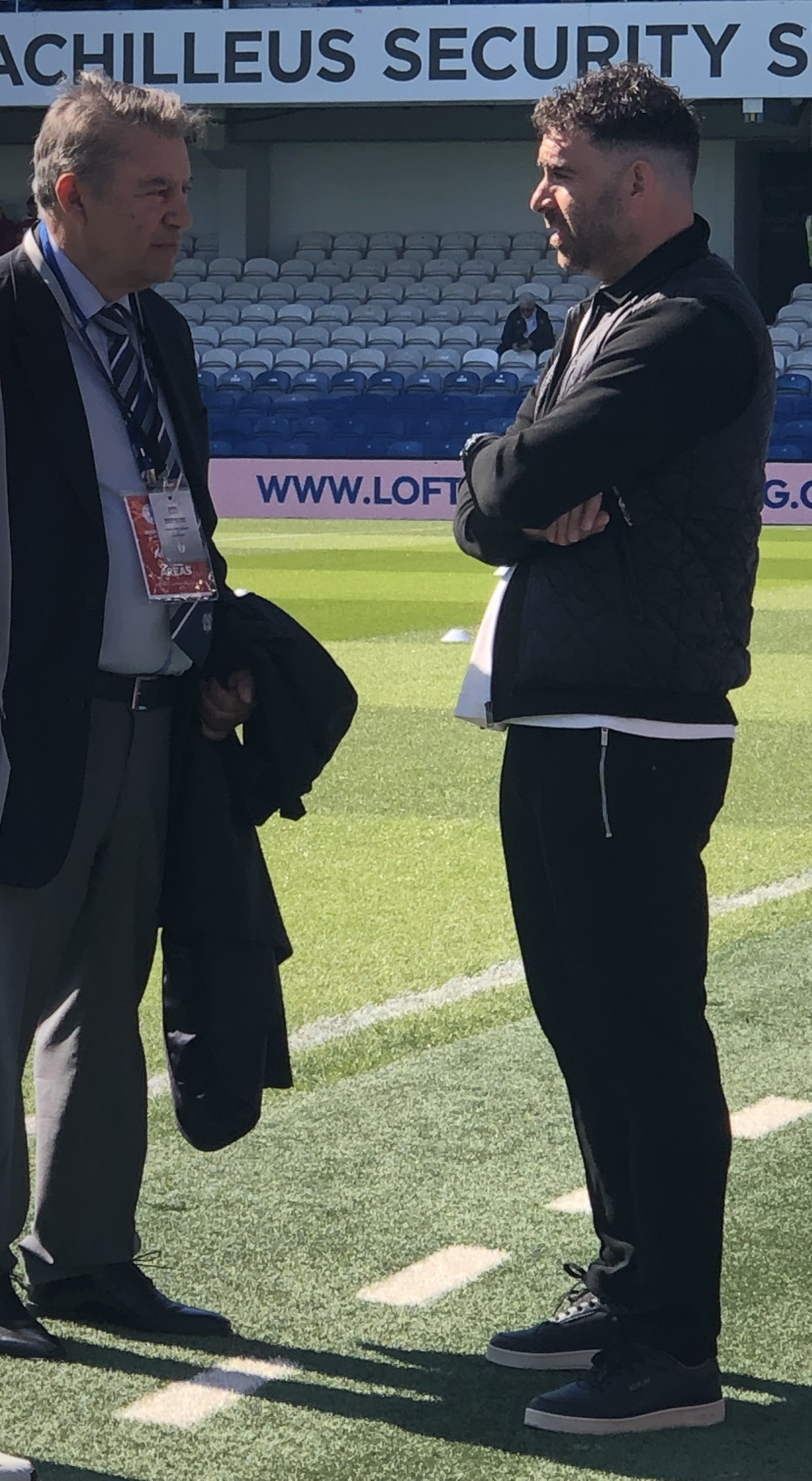
Riza (right) discussing with Cardiff City's chairman, Mehmet Dalman just two weeks before losing his job.

Riza joined EFL Championship club Cardiff City in June 2024, as first team coach in Turkish manager Erol Bulut's backroom staff. In September 2024, he was appointed as interim manager following Bulut's sacking. Riza lost 4–1 away to Hull City on his debut on 28 September, before earning Cardiff's first win of the season three days later with a 1–0 home victory over Millwall; he then said that he hoped to receive the job permanently. On 5 December 2024, Riza was given the Cardiff City job on a contract until the end of the 2024/2025 EFL Championship season.

On 19 April 2025, Cardiff sacked Riza, with Aaron Ramsey placed in charge for the rest of the season.

In April 2026, Riza was appointed as Assistant Head Coach of Serie B club Cesena working alongside Ashley Cole.

== Managerial statistics ==
As of 18 April 2025

Managerial record by team and tenure
Team	From	To	Record					Ref.
Team	From	To	P	W	D	L	Win %	Ref.
Cheshunt	30 August 2013	1 September 2014	49	12	18	19	24.49	
Leyton Orient	30 March 2017	10 July 2017	7	1	1	5	14.29	
Cardiff City	22 September 2024	19 April 2025	40	10	15	15	25.00	
Total			96	23	34	39	23.96	
