= Delphian League =

- Founded: 1951
- First season: 1951–52
- Folded: 1963
- Country: England
- Divisions: One
- Number of clubs: Lowest: 13; Highest: 16
- Feeder to: Corinthian League
- Domestic cup(s): FA Cup, FA Amateur Cup
- Most championships: Brentwood & Warley(3); Dagenham (3)

The Delphian League was an English amateur football league covering Greater London and the surrounding area.

== History ==
The league was founded on 14 March 1951 after a number of clubs who had been unable to join the 'big three' amateur leagues - the Athenian League, Isthmian League and Corinthian League - decided to create their own league. While the initial meeting was attended by representatives from 22 clubs, only 14 were elected for the league's initial season.

The league was, effectively, a level below the Corinthian League.

Due to the severe winter during the 1962–63 season the league was abandoned and an emergency competition played in which the clubs were split into two groups, playing each other only once. The two champions, Edmonton and Hertford Town, met in a two-legged final, with Edmonton winning 5–2.

At the end of the 1962–63 season both the Delphian League and the Corinthian League merged into the Athenian League, with the Corinthian League clubs forming Division One and Delphian League clubs forming Division Two.

From 1956, members of the league also competed in the Delphian League Cup.

== List of champions ==
Season	Champions
1951–52	Brentwood & Warley
1952–53	Dagenham
1953–54	Aylesbury United
1954–55	Bishop's Stortford
1955–56	Dagenham
1956–57	Dagenham
1957–58	Letchworth Town
1958–59	Brentwood & Warley
1959–60	Brentwood & Warley
1960–61	Hertford Town
1961–62	Hertford Town
1962–63	Edmonton

== Member clubs ==
During its twelve-season history, the league had 28 member clubs:

- Aveley
- Aylesbury United
- Berkhamsted Town
- Bishop's Stortford
- Brentwood & Warley
- Cheshunt
- Dagenham
- Edmonton
- Harlow Town
- Harrow Town
- Hemel Hempstead Town
- Hertford Town
- Histon
- Hornchurch & Upminster
- Leatherhead
- Letchworth Town
- Rainham Town
- Slough Centre
- Stevenage Town
- Tilbury
- Ware
- Wembley
- Willesden
- Windsor & Eton
- Wingate
- Wokingham Town
- Woodford Town
- Yiewsley

== See also ==
- List of Delphian League seasons
