= Knebworth F.C. =

Association football club in England

Knebworth
- Full name: Knebworth Football Club
- Nicknames: The Mighty Ks, Orange Army
- Founded: 1901 (re-formed 1999)
- Ground: Knebworth Recreation Ground
- Chairman: Stuart Biddle
- League: Herts County League Division Three
- 2024–25: Herts County League Division Three, 8th of 12
- Website: http://www.knebworthfc.co.uk/
Home colours	Away colours

Knebworth F.C. is an association football club based in Knebworth in Hertfordshire. The club plays in the Herts County League Division Three.

== History ==
Knebworth Football Club was formed in 1901. The club were founder members of the North Hertfordshire League in 1910, and were crowned the inaugural Champions.

The club folded in 1995 when their home at the former Kodak Sports & Social Club, now Odyssey Health & Racquet Club, was sold for development.

Knebworth Football Club was reformed in 1999 from an Under 18 squad, which graduated from Knebworth Youth Football Club.

The club began its new chapter in the Hertford and District League, starting out in Division Two. Promotion came in the first season and was followed by the Division One title and a League Cup Final appearance. Two seasons in the premier Division, finishing fourth and then third, prompted a move to the Herts Senior County League.

The third season in Division One of the Herts Senior County League, 2005–06, saw promotion with a third-placed finish, while the Reserves also gained promotion in the respective Reserve section. Following three seasons in the top flight of the County League, Knebworth were relegated to Division One at the end of the 2008–09 season.

== Honours ==
- Herts County League
  - Winners: 1973–74
- Herts County League Division one
  - Winners: 1976–77
- Herts County League Division 1A
  - Winners: 1962–63
- Herts County League Division Two
  - Winners: 1952–53

== Records ==
- Highest League Position
  - 4th in South Midlands Premier Division: 1984–85
- Best FA Vase Performance
  - Preliminary Round: 1975–76, 1977–78, 1978–79, 1979–80
