= East Anglian Cup =

Football competition

- Founded: 1903
- Abolished: 2009; 17 years ago
- Region: East Anglia
- Last champions: Tilbury (1st title)
- Most championships: Norwich City (12 titles)

The East Anglian Cup was a football competition that embraced East Anglian clubs in Essex, Norfolk and Suffolk, but also included clubs from a much wider geographical area, from Boston and Louth in Lincolnshire down to Oxford City, Chelsea and Gillingham in the South, plus Hertfordshire, Bedfordshire and Cambridgeshire teams as well. Amateur teams and the lower sides of professional clubs competed alongside each other in a long-running competition.

It was originally started as the South East Anglian League in 1903 with three clubs from Colchester (Colchester Town, Colchester Crown and Colchester Garrison), Ipswich Town and Harwich & Parkeston. The number of teams competing grew gradually and the “South” part of the name was dropped and the competition continued until World War I. After the War it was competed for as the East Anglian Cup for the first time in 1920–21, whilst the East Anglian League continued until it merged with the Norfolk & Suffolk League in 1964 to form the current Anglian Combination.

From 1921 to 1939 the rules limited membership to 16 clubs and it continued during World War II, whilst most football was suspended, providing competition for RAF teams, works sides and top amateur clubs of the time. Post War expansion saw the limit on numbers eventually removed in 1960 and the draw was made on a geographical basis to prevent large distances being travelled. The matches were arranged by mutual agreement between clubs and usually consisted of two rounds, an area semi-final, an area final, with the four winners meeting in the semi-finals and final. The competition lasted over a hundred years but seems to have fallen out of favour with the last final taking place in 2009.

Norwich City were the most successful team in the history of the East Anglian Cup with 12 victories from the early days to the 1920s and a treble in the late 1970s/early 1980s. Cambridge were the next most successful with 6 wins as Cambridge Town plus four more when they had changed their name to Cambridge City. King's Lynn and Romford were next with 5 apiece, although one for Romford includes their modern incarnation.

== Competition winners ==
Season	Winners	Ref
1903–04	Ipswich Town	
1904–05	Colchester Crown	
1905–06	King's Own Scottish Borderers	
1906–07	Colchester Town	
1907–08	King's Royal Rifles	
1908–09	Norwich City	
1909–10	West Yorkshire Regiment	
1910–11	West Yorkshire Regiment	
1911–12	Norwich City	
1912–13	Norwich City	
1913–14	Norwich City	
1914–19	Competition suspended	
1919–20	Norwich City	
1920–21	Norwich City	
1921–22	Norwich City	
1922–23	Norwich City	
1923–24	Cambridge Town	
1924–25	Chelmsford	
1925–26	Harwich & Parkeston	
1926–27	Chelmsford	
1927–28	Cambridge Town	
1928–29	Chelmsford	
1929–30	Lowestoft Town	
1930–31	Cambridge Town	
1931–32	Colchester Town	
1932–33	Harwich & Parkeston	
1933–34	Harwich & Parkeston	
1934–35	Romford	
1935–36	King's Lynn	
1936–37	Romford	
1937–38	Barking	
1938–39	Walthamstow Avenue and Lowestoft Town jointly	
1939–40	Walthamstow Avenue	
1940–41	Ford Sports	
1941–42	Walthamstow Avenue	
1942–43	Cambridge Town	
1943–44	Cambridge Town	
1944–45	Grays Athletic	
1945–46	Cambridge Town	
1946–47	Crittall Athletic	
1947–48	Cambridge Town	
1948–49	Chelmsford City	
1949–50	Tottenham Hotspur	
1950–51	Great Yarmouth Town	
1951–52	Romford	
1952–53	Gorleston	
1953–54	Barking and March Town jointly	
1954–55	Romford	
1955–56	Romford	
1956–57	Clacton Town	
1957–58	Tottenham Hotspur	
1958–59	Norwich City	
1959–60	Cambridge City	
1960–61	Boston United	
1961–62	Cambridge United	
1962–63	Hertford Town	
1963–64	Stevenage Town	
1964–65	Cambridge City	
1965–66	King's Lynn	
1966–67	King's Lynn	
1967–68	King's Lynn	
1968–69	Braintree & Crittall Athletic	
1969–70	Hertford Town	
1970–71	Lowestoft Town	
1971–72	Dagenham	
1972–73	Hitchin Town	
1973–74	Ware	
1974–75	Cheshunt	
1975–76	Cambridge City	
1976–77	Letchworth Garden City	
1977–78	Lowestoft Town	
1978–79	Norwich City	
1979–80	Norwich City	
1980–81	Norwich City	
1981–82	Bishop's Stortford	
1982–83	Gorleston	
1983–84	Stansted	
1984–85	King's Lynn	
1985–86	Sudbury Town	
1986–87	Not completed	
1987-88	Wisbech Town	
1988-89	Aveley	
1989-90	Harlow Town	
1990-91	Haverhill Rovers	
1991-92	Sudbury Town	
1992-93	St Albans City	
1993-94	Heybridge Swifts	
1994-95	Heybridge Swifts	
1995-96	Braintree Town	
1996-97	Potton United	
1997-98	Romford	
1998-99	Ipswich Wanderers	
1999-2000	Clacton Town	
2000-01	Cancelled - bad weather	
2001-02	Harlow Town	
2002-03	East Thurrock United	
2003-04	Spalding United	
2004-05	Spalding United	
2005-06	Harlow Town	
2006-07	Needham Market	
2007-08	Leiston	
2008-09	Tilbury	

=== Wins by teams ===
Club	Wins	First final won	Last final won	Notes
Norwich City	12	1908–09	1980–81	
Cambridge City	10	1923–24	1975–76	Won 6 titles as Cambridge Town.
King's Lynn †	5	1935–36	1984–85	Dissolved in 2009.
Romford	6	1934–35	1997–98	
Chelmsford City	5	1924–25	1948–49	Won 4 titles as Chelmsford.
Lowestoft Town	4	1929–30	1977–78	
Braintree Town	3	1946–47	1995–96	Won 1 title as Braintree & Crittall Athletic and 1 title as Crittall Athletic.
Harlow Town	3	1989–90	2005–06	
Harwich & Parkeston	3	1925–26	1933–34	
Walthamstow Avenue †	3	1938–39	1941–42	Dissolved in 1988.
Barking	2	1937–38	1953–54	
Clacton Town	2	1956–57	1999–2000	
Colchester Town †	2	1906–07	1931–32	Dissolved in 1937.
Gorleston	2	1952–53	1982–83	
Hertford Town	2	1962–63	1969–70	
Heybridge Swifts	2	1993–94	1994–95	
Spalding United	2	2003–04	2004–05	
Sudbury Town †	2	1985–86	1991–92	Dissolved in 1999.
Tottenham Hotspur	2	1949–50	1957–58	
West Yorkshire Regiment	2	1909–10	1910–11	
Aveley	1	1988–89	1988–89	
Bishop's Stortford	1	1981–82	1981–82	
Boston United	1	1960–61	1960–61	
Cambridge United	1	1961–62	1961–62	
Cheshunt	1	1974–75	1974–75	
Colchester Crown †	1	1904–05	1904–05	Dissolved.
Dagenham †	1	1971–72	1971–72	Dissolved in 1992. Merged with Redbridge Forest to form Dagenham & Redbridge.
East Thurrock United †	1	2002–03	2002–03	Dissolved in 2023.
Ford Sports	1	1940–41	1940–41	
Grays Athletic	1	1944–45	1944–45	
Great Yarmouth Town	1	1950–51	1950–51	
Haverhill Rovers	1	1990–91	1990–91	
Hitchin Town	1	1972–73	1972–73	
Ipswich Town	1	1903–04	1903–04	
Ipswich Wanderers	1	1998–99	1998–99	
King's Own Scottish Borderers †	1	1905–06	1905–06	Dissolved in 1908.
King's Royal Rifles	1	1907–08	1907–08	
Leiston	1	2007–08	2007–08	
Letchworth Garden City †	1	1976–77	1976–77	Dissolved in 2000s.
March Town	1	1953–54	1953–54	
Needham Market	1	2006–07	2006–07	
Potton United	1	1996–97	1996–97	
St Albans City	1	1992–93	1992–93	
Stansted	1	1983–84	1983–84	
Stevenage Town †	1	1963–64	1963–64	Dissolved in 1968.
Tilbury	1	2008–09	2008–09	
Ware	1	1973–74	1973–74	
