= Micky Dulin =

English footballer and manager (1935–2021)

Personal information
- Full name: Michael Charles Dulin
- Date of birth: 25 October 1935
- Place of birth: Stepney, England
- Date of death: 16 March 2021 (aged 85)
- Position: Winger

Senior career*
| Years | Team | Apps | (Gls) |
| ????–1952 | Welwyn Garden City | | |
| 1952–1958 | Tottenham Hotspur | 10 | (2) |

Managerial career
- Barking
- * Club domestic league appearances and goals

Michael Charles Dulin (25 October 1935 – 16 March 2021) was an English professional footballer who played for Welwyn Garden City and Tottenham Hotspur.

== Playing career ==
Dulin was born in Stepney, England, and was Jewish. He began his career at non-league club Welwyn Garden City before joining Tottenham Hotspur in November 1952. The winger made his debut against Burnley on 17 December 1955 and went on to feature in 11 matches and scored two goals in all competitions between 1952 and 1958 before injury forced him to retire from the game.

== Post-football career ==
After retiring from competitive football, Dulin took the post of a fire brigade welfare officer. He later became a sports development officer with the London Borough of Waltham Forest, and managed Barking. Dulin lived in Hertford but kept a football connection with Wingate & Finchley, where he was the life vice president of the club. Dulin died on 16 March 2021

== See also ==
- List of select Jewish football (association; soccer) players
