= Ralph Wetton =

English footballer

Personal information
- Date of birth: 6 June 1927
- Place of birth: Winlaton, England
- Date of death: 2 June 2017 (aged 89)
- Position: Wing half

Senior career*
Years	Team	Apps	(Gls)
1949–1950	Cheshunt	43	(10)
1950–1955	Tottenham Hotspur	45	(0)
1955–1956	Plymouth Argyle	36	(1)
1956–1957	Aldershot	50	(1)
1958–1959	Harlow Town		
1960–1962	Cheshunt	43	(5)

Managerial career
- 1961-1962: Cheshunt
- * Club domestic league appearances and goals

Ralph Wetton (6 June 1927 – 2 June 2017) was an English professional footballer who played for Cheshunt, Tottenham Hotspur, Plymouth Argyle and Aldershot.

== Playing career ==
Born in Winlaton, Wetton joined Tottenham Hotspur from non-league Cheshunt in August 1950, where he had been a member of their London League-winning side. Signed as cover for Tottenham and Wales skipper Ron Burgess, he made his senior debut at wing half on 20 October 1951 in a fixture versus Aston Villa when Burgess was injured. He featured in 46 senior appearances in all competitions for the Spurs between 1951 and 1955. Wetton signed for Plymouth Argyle in June 1955 and went on make a further 36 appearances and scoring one goal. After leaving Plymouth he joined Aldershot in November 1956 and scored one goal in 50 matches. He then joined non-league Harlow Town as player-manager before returning to Cheshunt in 1960 where he was also appointed player-manager soon after his arrival. He was sacked at the end of the 1961–62 season after which he became involved in the founding of Brimsdown Rovers where he remained as a committee member for many years after.

Wetton's brother Albert played league football for Brighton & Hove Albion and Crewe Alexandra.
