= Bedford Town F.C. =

English football club

Coordinates: 52°07′44″N 0°24′50″W

Bedford Town
- Full name: Bedford Town Football Club
- Nickname: The Eagles
- Founded: 31 July 1908; 5 May 1989 (refounded)
- Dissolved: 1982
- Ground: The New Eyrie, Cardington, Bedford
- Capacity: 3,000 (300 seated)
- Owner: Jon Taylor
- Chairman: Adrian Brown
- Manager: Harry Smart
- League: National League North
- 2025–26: National League North, 18th of 22
Home colours	Away colours	Third colours

Bedford Town Football Club is a semi-professional football club based in Cardington, Bedford, England. The club are full members of the Football Association and affiliated to the Bedfordshire County Football Association.

Although forerunners to the club had been in existence as early as 1884, Bedford Town Football Club was founded in 1908 and played in local leagues before joining the Southern League in 1945, winning the championship in 1958–59. During the 1950s and 1960s the club became known for a series of FA Cup runs, including a third-round tie against Arsenal in 1955–56 and a fourth-round match against Everton in 1965–66 that drew a record crowd of 18,407 to the club's Queens Park ground. Between 1955 and 1975, the club made eighteen unsuccessful applications for election to the Football League, the second-highest number of any club after Yeovil Town.

Bedford were dissolved in 1982 after their lease on the Queens Park ground was terminated and plans for a new stadium fell through. However, the club was reformed by supporters in 1989, initially playing on public pitches in Queens Park before moving to a new ground, the Eyrie, in Cardington, in 1993. Starting in the South Midlands League, the club climbed through the non-league pyramid, and is currently in the National League North, the sixth tier of English football.

== History ==
=== Pre-war ===
A Bedford Town Football Club was in existence by 1884, although it changed its name to Bedford Association in 1887. As there were no leagues at the time, the club played friendly matches in cups, including the Kettering Charity Cup and the Luton Charity Cup, before disappearing in 1891. The name Bedford Town reappeared in 1894 when Swifts, a club founded in 1890, were renamed. They absorbed Bedford Rovers in 1896, and although local leagues had been formed, the club continued to play only cup matches and friendlies. However, the club disappeared around the turn of the century.

On 31 July 1908 a new Bedford Town was formed at the Association Rooms on Harpur Street. They joined Division One of the Northamptonshire League, finishing bottom of the table in their first two seasons, but avoiding relegation to Division Two. They went on to finish as runners-up for three consecutive seasons between 1911–12 and 1913–14 before the league closed down due to World War I. They also won the Northamptonshire Senior Cup in 1912–13.

After the war the club continued in the league, finishing as Division One runners-up in 1929–30 before winning the title in 1930–31. The following season saw them finish in second place again, after which they won back-to-back titles in 1932–33 and 1933–34. The league was then renamed the United Counties League, with Bedford finishing as runners-up in 1934–35 and reaching the first round of the FA Cup for the first time, losing 3–2 at home to Dartford. They finished as runners-up again in 1936–37, remaining in the league until World War II.

=== Southern League and cup success ===
In 1945 Bedford joined the Southern League. They reached the first round of the FA Cup several times in the early 1950s, losing 2–0 at Swindon Town in 1951–52, 4–0 at Weymouth in 1953–54 and 2–0 at Dorchester Town in 1954–55. In 1955 they applied for election to the Football League after finishing eighteenth in the Southern League, but received no votes.

The 1955–56 season saw them reach the first round of the FA Cup again, and for the first time they progressed to the next round after beating Leyton 3–0. The second round saw them defeat Football League opposition for the first time as they won 3–2 against Watford, before being drawn against Arsenal in the third round. The first match at Highbury ended 2–2, with Arsenal winning the replay 2–1. They applied for election to the Football League again following a third-place finish in the Southern League, but again failed to receive a vote.

In the following season the club again beat Football League opposition in the FA Cup, defeating Norwich City 4–2 at Carrow Road before losing 1–0 at Reading. They finished as runners-up in both 1956–57 and 1957–58, again applying unsuccessfully for Football League membership, although they received one vote in 1957 and two in 1958. The Southern League was split into North-West and South-East divisions for the 1958–59 season, with Bedford winning the South-East section and going on to beat North-West champions Hereford United 2–1 in a championship play-off at Edgar Street. Despite winning the Southern League, they failed to receive a single vote in the 1959 Football League elections.

The following season saw further league re-organisation, with Bedford placed in the new Premier Division; their FA Cup campaign ended with a 4–0 first round defeat at home to Gillingham. However, the mid-1960s was an extremely successful period for the club in the cup; in 1962–63 they reached the second round where they were again beaten by Gillingham, this time away. The following season saw them beat non-League opposition in the first and second round before being drawn against Second Division Newcastle United in the third round. A trip to St James' Park resulted in a 2–1 win for Bedford, before they were defeated 3–0 by Carlisle United in the fourth round in front of a then-record crowd of 17,858. The club were prevented from applying for Football League membership that year as they had signed players from the league without paying transfer fees. The 1965–66 season saw them reach the fourth round again, beating Exeter City 2–1 in the first round, Brighton & Hove Albion 2–1 in a second replay in the second round. Hereford United were then defeated 2–1 in the third round, before a fourth round tie saw them lose 3–0 at home to Everton in front of a record crowd of 18,407. Another cup run in 1966–67 resulted in a second round win over Oxford United before a 6–2 defeat at home to Peterborough United in the third round.

However, that season saw them finish second-from-bottom in the league, resulting in relegation to Division One. The following season saw them promoted in third place, but they were relegated again in 1968–69. However, a second immediate return to the top division was secured when they won Division One in 1969–70. Bedford were relegated again at the end of the 1973–74 season, but won Division One North at the first attempt to return to the Premier Division, also reaching the semi-finals of the FA Trophy, eventually losing 6–2 on aggregate to Scarborough. The club had continued to apply for Football League membership every season between 1965 and 1973, and after a hiatus in 1974, made their eighteenth and final bid for Football League membership in 1975, but were again unsuccessful, leaving them with the second-highest number of unsuccessful applications after Yeovil Town. An FA Cup first round appearance in 1975–76 resulted in defeat to Wycombe Wanderers in a second replay. The 1977–78 season resulted in another relegation to Division One North. League reorganisation in 1979 saw them placed in the Midland Division. They reached the first round of the FA Cup for a thirteenth time in 1981–82, losing 2–0 at Wimbledon. However, the club was disbanded at the end of the season after their lease at Queens Park was terminated and a planned new stadium at Barkers Lane fell through.

=== 1989 re-establishment ===
The club was re-formed in 1989, and joined Division One of the South Midlands League for the 1991–92 season. After finishing fourth in their first season, they won Division One in 1992–93, before going on to win the Premier Division the following season, earning promotion to Division Three of the Isthmian League. A third-place finish in their first season in the league saw them promoted to Division Two. In 1998–99 they were Division Two champions, earning promotion to Division One, and after finishing as runners-up in 2000–01, were promoted to the Premier Division. The following season saw their first appearance in the FA Cup first round since reforming and resulted in a 2–1 defeat at Peterborough United in a replay.

After finishing fifteenth in 2003–04 Bedford entered the play-offs for the final positions in the newly created Conference North and South. They beat Hitchin Town 3–1 in the semi-finals, but lost the final 5–4 to St Albans City. Instead, the club was transferred to the Premier Division of the Southern League for the 2004–05 season. A fifth-place finish in 2005–06 saw them qualify for the promotion play-offs. Following a 1–0 win at Bath City in the semi-finals, they beat Chippenham Town 3–2 in the final to earn promotion to the Conference South. However, they lasted only one season, finishing bottom of the division, and were relegated back to the Southern League.

The 2013–14 season saw Bedford finish second-bottom of the Premier Division, resulting in relegation to Division One Central. In 2021–22 the club were Division One Central champions, earning promotion to the Premier Division Central. However, they finished bottom of the division the following season and were relegated back to Division One Central. In 2023–24 the club were runners-up, qualifying for the promotion play-offs. After beating Ware 2–1 in the semi-finals, they defeated Waltham Abbey 2–1 in the final to secure promotion to the Premier Division Central. They went on to win the Premier Division Central title in 2024–25, earning promotion to the National League North.

In January 2025, plans were announced for a merger with fellow Bedford club Real Bedford, whose chairman Peter McCormack had attempted unsuccessfully to buy Bedford Town three years prior, though the merger was postponed in April 2025, as it could not be completed in time to take effect for the 2025–26 season.

== Colours, nickname and badge ==
The club's nickname, "The Eagles", is derived from the eagle that has featured on the town's coat of arms since at least the 16th century. The arms depict a black eagle surmounted by a gold castle of three tiers. The nickname was in use almost immediately after the club's formation in 1908; the Bedfordshire Times referred to the team as "Eagles" in its report of 13 November 1908, covering a match against Raunds St Peter's the previous week.

The club's original colours were black and amber. These were changed to blue and white at the start of the 1950–51 season, and the club has played in blue ever since.

== Ground ==
The original Bedford Town played at London Road in 1886, before playing most of its matches at Bedford Park between 1887 and 1890. They then moved to a ground located off London Road.

After being reformed in 1908, the club started playing at a site off London Road, before moving to the Queens Park football ground in Queens Park during October. The pitch was originally between Havelock Street and Lawrence Street, before they moved to one at the end of Nelson Street. There were initially no spectator facilities, with duckboards only put down in November 1911. During World War I the ground was used by the Army, and it was still in use in 1919 when the club started playing again. As a result, they played on the playing fields of County School until being able to return to Queens Park in December 1919.

The club started to develop the ground in the 1920s, with banking created and a new 300-seat stand installed on the western side of the ground in 1922 at a cost of £250. With the extension of the roof, the seating capacity was later increased to about 400. However, players still changed in the nearby Horse and Groom pub. A covered terrace was installed in 1930 and dressing rooms built the following year. Another covered stand was installed at the Ford End Road end of the ground in 1935, which was replaced by a more modern stand in 1953. The capacity had reached at least 6,000, and a new record attendance of 5,667 was set for the FA Cup match against Dartford in 1934–35. The roof of the stand built in 1930 was destroyed in late 1938 and was replaced by the start of the 1939–40 season. Further ground developments in the 1950s raised the capacity to 18,500, with the record attendance of 18,407 set for an FA Cup game against Everton in 1965–66.

In 1982 the club's lease on Queens Park was terminated and after a proposed new ground in the Barkers Lane area failed to come to fruition, the club folded. When the club re-formed in 1989, they initially played on public pitches in Queens Park, before finding a site in Cardington to build a new ground. The New Eyrie opened on 6 August 1993 with a friendly match against Peterborough United attracting what remains the ground's record attendance of 3,000. It has a capacity of 3,000, of which 300 is seated and 1,000 covered. The ground is located next to McMullen Park, the home ground of local rivals Real Bedford. The club commenced work on a new artificial pitch at The New Eyrie in June 2024, which was completed in late September.

== Current squad ==
As of 19 August 2026

Note: Flags indicate national team as defined under FIFA eligibility rules; some limited exceptions apply. Players may hold more than one non-FIFA nationality.

No.	Pos.	Nation	Player
1	GK	ENG	Laurie Walker
2	DF	ENG	Sonnie Davis
3	DF	ENG	Joe Payne
4	DF	ENG	Ryan Doherty
5	DF	ENG	Greg Taylor
6	DF	GER	Festus Arthur
7	MF	ENG	Josh Castiglione
8	MF	GER	Edward Gyamfi
9	FW	ENG	Michael Gyasi (on loan at Kettering Town)
10	MF	ENG	George Moncur
11	FW	ENG	Finley Wilkinson
12	DF	ENG	Lewis Franklin
13	GK	ENG	Aaron Flahavan

No.	Pos.	Nation	Player
14	MF	ENG	Peter Abimbola
15	FW	NIR	Reece Evans (on loan from Reading)
17	MF	ENG	Ben Weyman
18	DF	TCA	Anthony Stewart
19	MF	ENG	Ryan Cole
20	MF	ENG	Declan Phillips
21	FW	ENG	Jonny Edwards (on loan from Hednesford Town)
22	FW	ENG	Noah Mosanya
23	FW	ENG	Eno Nto
24	MF	ENG	Calum Doyle
25	MF	ENG	Troy Perez-Duah
28	MF	ENG	David Hicks (on loan from Reading)

== Coaching staff ==
Position	Player
Manager	(England) Harry Smart
Assistant Manager	(England) Anthony Fontanelle
First Team Coach	(England) James Petty
Physio	(England) Jazzy Dolby
Goalkeeping Coach	(Wales) Gareth Davies
Goalkeeping Coach	(England) Jamie Stephens

== Managerial history ==
Name	Appointed	Left
Harry Smart	5 May 2026	Present
Lee Bircham	4 May 2023	3 May 2026
Graeme Tomlinson	11 January 2023	4 May 2023
Paul Davis	27 December 2022	11 January 2023
Graeme Tomlinson	1 December 2022	27 December 2022
Gary Setchell	25 September 2020	30 November 2022
Mark Ducket	15 January 2020	23 September 2020
Nathan Abbey	21 June 2019	14 January 2020
Jon Taylor	1 October 2015	3 November 2019
Dan Kennoy	15 June 2015	September 2015
Craig Adams	20 March 2014	21 May 2015
Danny Nicholls	3 January 2014	16 March 2014
Lee Bearman	7 May 2013	26 December 2013
Nick Platnauer	May 2012	6 May 2013
Ady Hall	30 October 2010	May 2012
Ady Williams	23 March 2010	16 October 2010
Lee Howarth	July 2008	March 2010
Stuart Bimson	16 February 2007	July 2008
Nick Platnauer	January 2004	February 2007
Dave Randall	October 2003	January 2004
Kevin Wilson	2 October 2002	7 October 2003
Dave Randall	2002 (caretaker)	
Roger Ashby	1 November 1999	19 September 2002
Tony Luff Jason Reed	May 1998	November 1999
Mick Foster	January 1996	May 1998
Tony Sullivan Terry King	1992	January 1996
Tony Sullivan	1989	
Club disbanded
Trevor Gould	August 1978	August 1982
Barry Fry	1 July 1977	30 June 1978
Jim Walker	April 1973	June 1977
Brian Garvey	1972	March 1973
Reg Smith	1971 (caretaker)	1972 (caretaker)
Alan Wright	March 1969	October 1971
Ron Heckman	1967	March 1969
Ron Burgess	1 February 1966	28 March 1967
Basil Hayward	1964	January 1966
Tim Kelly	December 1963	1964
Reg Smith	November 1961	December 1963
Ronnie Rooke	1959	September 1961
Tim Kelly	April 1955	June 1959
Fred Stansfield	March 1954	March 1955
Ronnie Rooke	February 1951	December 1953
Charlie Bicknell	April 1948	March 1951
By committee	January 1947	April 1948
Alf Strange	August 1945	January 1947
By committee	July 1939	August 1945
Len Potter	August 1938	July 1939
By committee	22 January 1938	August 1938
Leslie Odell	September 1937	22 January 1938
By committee	September 1936	September 1937
Charlie Chester (de facto)	July 1908	September 1936
Source: Bedford Town, Bedford Eagles; Southern League, Bromsgrove Sporting

== Honours ==
- Southern League
  - Champions 1958–59
  - Premier Division Central champions 2024–25
  - South East Division champions 1958–59
  - Division One champions 1969–70
  - Division One North champions 1974–75
  - Division One Central champions 2021–22
  - League Cup winners 1980–81
- Isthmian League
  - Division Two champions 1998–99
  - Vandanel Trophy winners 1997–98
- South Midlands League
  - Premier Division champions 1993–94
  - Division One champions 1992–93
- United Counties League
  - Division One champions 1930–31, 1932–33, 1933–34
  - War League champions 1939–40
- Eastern Professional Floodlight League
  - Champions 1970–71
- Northamptonshire Senior Cup
  - Winners 1912–13
- Bedfordshire Premier Cup
  - Winners 1924–25, 1926–27, 1928–29
- Bedfordshire Professional Cup
  - Winners 1962–63, 1963–64, 1964–65, 1965–66
- Huntingdonshire Premier Cup
  - Winners 1951–52, 1958–59, 1959–60, 1963–64, 1966–67
- Bedfordshire Invitation Cup
  - Winners 1938–39, 1953–54
- North Bedfordshire Charity Cup
  - Winners 1910–11

== Records ==
- Best FA Cup performance: Fourth round, 1963–64, 1965–66
- Best FA Trophy performance: Semi-finals, 1974–75
- Best FA Vase performance: Fifth round, 1998–99
- Most appearances: David Skinn
- Most goals in a match: Joe Chamberlain, 9 goals vs Rushden Fosse, December 1911
- Biggest win: 9–0 vs Weymouth, Southern League, 1954–55; vs Poole, 1958–59; vs Ickleford, vs Cardington
- Heaviest defeat: 10–0 vs Merthyr Tydfil, 1950–51; vs Yeovil Town, 1960–61
- Record attendance:
  - At Queens Park: 18,407 vs Everton, FA Cup, 1965–66
  - At the New Eyrie: 3,000 vs Peterborough United, friendly match, 6 August 1993

== See also ==
- Bedford Town F.C. players
- Bedford Town F.C. managers
