= Harry Robshaw =

English footballer

Personal information
- Full name: Henry William Robshaw
- Date of birth: 10 May 1927
- Place of birth: Edmonton, England
- Date of death: 1990 (aged 62–63)
- Position: Wing half

Senior career*
Years	Team	Apps	(Gls)
1948–1953	Tottenham Hotspur	1	(0)
1953	Reading	20	(1)
?	Tonbridge	?	(?)
- * Club domestic league appearances and goals

Henry William "Harry" Robshaw (10 May 1927 – 1990) was an English professional footballer who played for Tottenham Hotspur, Reading and Tonbridge.

== Playing career ==
Robshaw joined Tottenham Hotspur in November 1948 as a junior. The wing half played one senior match for the "Lilies" in a fixture against Liverpool on 1 December 1951. He signed for Reading in February 1953 and scored once in 20 matches. Robshaw went on to have a spell at Tonbridge.
