= Cheshunt F.C. =

English football club

Coordinates: 51°41′40″N 0°2′30″W

Cheshunt
- Full name: Cheshunt Football Club
- Nickname: The Ambers
- Founded: 1946
- Ground: Theobalds Lane, Cheshunt
- Capacity: 3,174
- Owner: LW Developments
- Chairman: Dean Williamson
- Manager: James Elliott
- League: Isthmian League Premier Division
- 2025–26: Isthmian League Premier Division, 13th of 22
- Website: cheshuntfc.com
Home colours	Away colours

Cheshunt Football Club is a football club based in Cheshunt, Hertfordshire, England. They are currently members of the Isthmian League Premier Division and play at Theobalds Lane.

== History ==
=== Original club ===
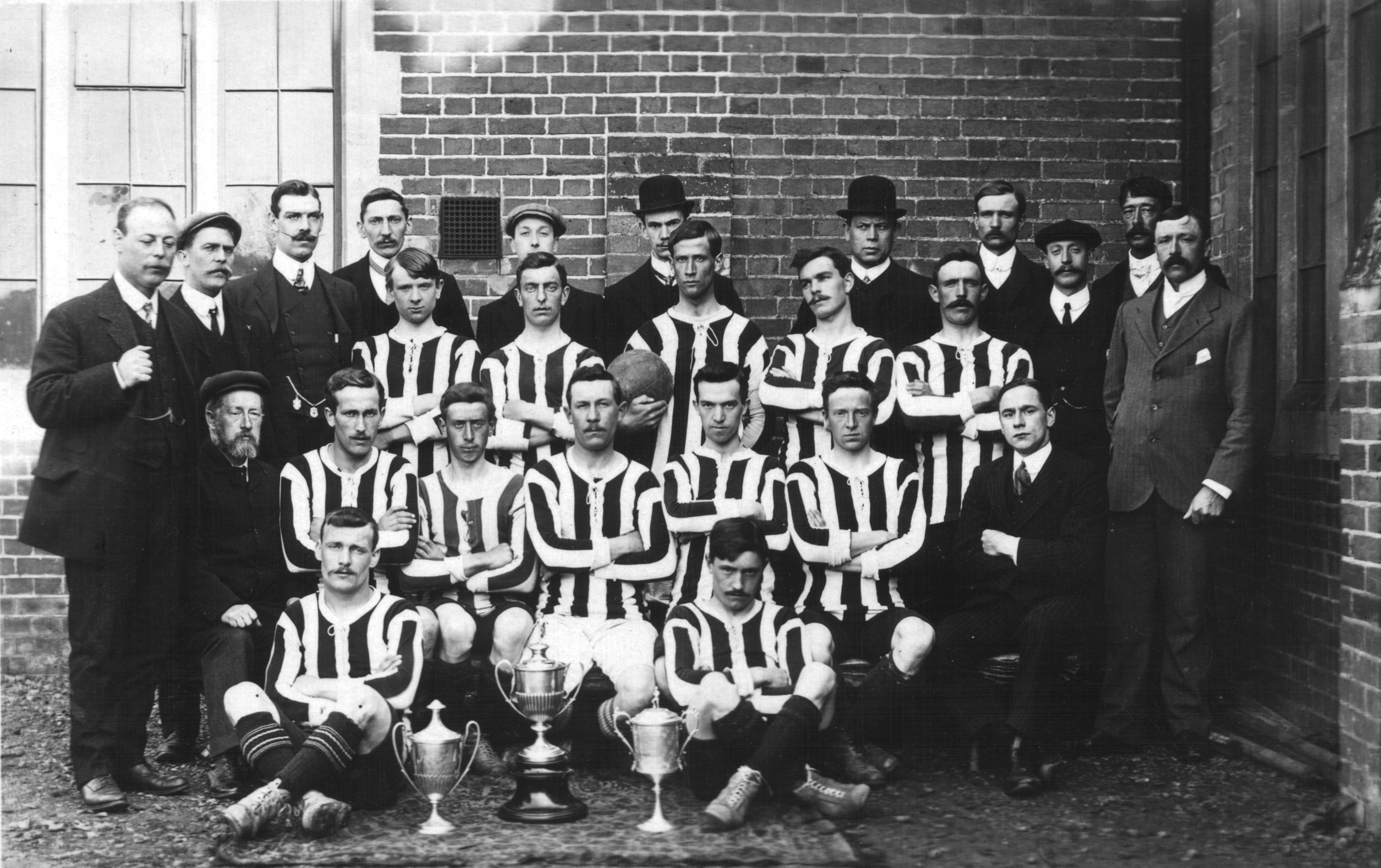
The original Cheshunt Football Club posing in 1905 with the trophies won that season.

The original Cheshunt Football Club was formed around 1880 and played in black and white stripes. The first recorded game was in 1888, winning 4–0 against Novocastrians. They won the first Herts Charity Cup in 1900–01 and went on to win it again in 1903–04 and 1905–06. They also reached the FA Amateur Cup semi-final in 1903–04, losing 2–0 to Ealing.

After leaving the Football Association in 1907 to join the AFA, they then became founder members of the Southern Amateur League in the same year and competed in Section B until World War I, They joined the Athenian league in 1919–20, leaving and rejoining the Southern Amateur in 1920–21 where they won Section B, before rejoining the Athenian league in 1921–22. They won the Herts Senior Cup in 1923–24 beating Hoddesdon Town 3–0 in the final. After their best league position of fifth in 1926–27, Cheshunt's form collapsed and they finished bottom of the Athenian league for the next four seasons. Heavily in debt, they disbanded in 1931 after their landlords, Cheshunt Cricket Club, raised the rent on their Albury Ride ground.

=== Modern club ===
The modern club was established in July 1946 at a public meeting in the Co-op Hall in Waltham Cross. A group of local businessmen decided to form a new club for the town, and local junior team Crossbrook Sports were used as the basis for the new club, retaining their amber and black kit. They immediately applied and were accepted into the London League, playing in Division One for the 1946–47 season. They finished runners-up (recording their biggest ever win, 11–0 at Royal Ordnance Factory, in the process) and won the League Cup and Herts Charity Shield.

Cheshunt won Division One in 1947–48 but remained in the same division. They won it again in 1948–49, earning promotion to the Premier Division, and reached the Herts Senior Cup final for the first time. The following season they won the Premier Division, beating Tilbury on the last day of the season to clinch the title from them. They also reached the third round of the Amateur Cup following a run that included defeating holders Bromley in front of a record crowd of 5,000.

During the 1950s the club changed leagues several times; they were members of the Delphian League between 1951–52 and 1954–55, rejoined the London League in 1955 and then left to become founder members of the Aetolian League in 1959. In 1957–58 they reached the FA Cup fourth qualifying round for the first time.

Cheshunt joined the Spartan League for the 1962–63 season and won the title at the first attempt. The following season they won the Spartan League Cup, before joining Division Two of the Athenian League in 1964. They finished runners-up in their second season under the management of Terry Medwin, the former Welsh international, and were promoted to Division One, also winning the Herts Charity Shield. The Division One title was won in 1967–68, beating Wembley in a head-to-head championship decider, to earn promotion to the Premier Division.

They won the Mithras Cup in 1969–70, the London Charity Cup in 1973–74, the Athenian League Cup and East Anglian Cup in 1974–75 and the Athenian League Cup again in 1975–76. They also reached four Herts Senior Cup finals, two Mithras Cup finals as well as solitary East Anglian Cup and Herts Charity Cup finals during the 1970s. Between 1975 and 1995, the club had yellow and blue as its club colours, reverting to amber and black afterwards.

After several failed attempts, Cheshunt joined Division Two of the Isthmian League in 1977. In 1981–82 they finished second, and were promoted to Division One, but were relegated two seasons later. At the start of the 1986–87 season a mass walkout of Committee, management and players – due to budget cuts and demands to see a first team made up of former youth team players – led to Cheshunt finishing bottom of Division Two and being relegated into the Spartan League.

In 1992–93 Cheshunt won the Spartan League Cup and finished third in the league, earning promotion back to Division Three of the Isthmian League. They finished second in their first season and were promoted to Division Two, but were relegated at the end of the 1997–98 season. However, they made an immediate return to Division Two after finishing third. In 2002–03 they won the division, and were promoted to Division One. A third-place finish the following year saw them promoted to the Premier Division. At the end of the season the club finished in the relegation zone, but avoided being demoted after Hornchurch went bust. Instead, the club were transferred to the Southern League Premier Division. In 2007–08 they were relegated, and were placed in Division One North of the Isthmian League. In 2016–17 the club won the Herts Charity Cup for the third time.

League reorganisation saw Cheshunt placed in the South Central Division for the 2018–19 season. After a third-place finish, the club third in the division, qualifying for the promotion play-offs. They defeated Marlow 2–1 in the semi-finals and Bracknell Town 3–0 in the final to secure promotion back to the Premier Division. After finishing fifth position in 2021–22, Cheshunt went on to win the promotion play-offs, defeating Hornchurch 2–1 in final, earning promotion to the National League South. However, they finished second-from-bottom of the National League South the following season and were relegated back to the Premier Division of the Isthmian League.

=== Other teams ===
Cheshunt have a women's team playing as Cheshunt FC Women. They earned promotion to the Eastern Region Women's Football League in 2020–21.

== Stadium ==
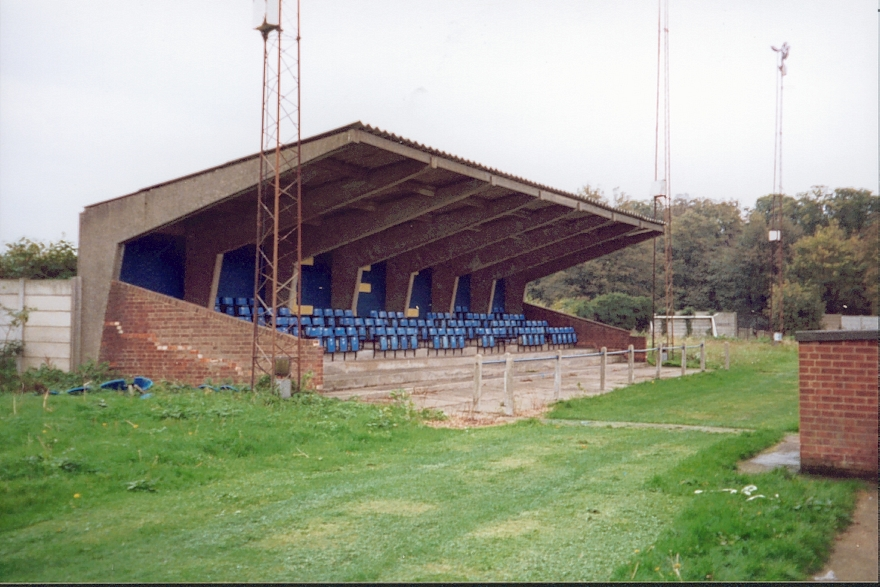
Theobalds Lane

The original Cheshunt Football Club played at the Recreation Ground on Albury Ride, a ground owned by Cheshunt Cricket Club.

The modern club initially played at the Gothic sports ground, before moving to College Road for their second season. In 1949 they moved to the Cheshunt Stadium on Theobalds Lane. Originally a gravel pit, by the 1930s the site had become the local rubbish tip, but between February and October 1949, it was cleared, levelled and a pitch was laid. Two Nissen huts were assembled, where the main gates are today, for changing rooms (with no power, telephone line or hot water), leaving the players with a long walk uphill to the pitch. The ground was opened on 29 October 1949, with the club recording their record home win (11–1 against Hastings United) in the ground's first fixture.

Drainage problems forced the club to abandon the stadium before the 1949–50 season had ended and move to a new ground on Brookfield Lane. However, they returned to Theobalds Lane in 1952–53 but again left after a season, due to the poor playing surface, to return to Brookfield Lane though this time as the tenants of Tottenham Hotspur, who were using it as their training ground. At the end of the 1957–58 season Cheshunt were asked to leave and so returned to Theobalds Lane. Chairman Les Noble and vice-chair Frank Davis moved quickly to secure a 21-year lease on the stadium (which was about to be used by a new club, Waltham Cross FC) and spent £2,500 getting bulldozers in to level space for the present stand and Clubhouse (then the changing rooms too) to be built and clearing the banking to make way for a running track around the pitch (which was removed in the 1980s).

The clubhouse and pitch were ready for the opening game of the 1957–58 season against Wingate. A year later the main stand was built by the groundsman Albert Prior, his son Maurice and chairman Frank Davis in their spare time. It held 400 spectators on bench seats and had a door in the centre to the changing rooms. A covered terrace was built on the other side of the pitch in 1963, although located 20 yards back from the pitch. Floodlights came in 1964, the current function hall three years later. In 1977 the current changing rooms were built, enabling the conversion of the old changing rooms to the clubhouse. In 1982 proper seating was installed for the first time, with the oak seats in the directors box were taken from White Hart Lane's old west stand (which was being demolished) and the plywood seating to the north end of the stand was taken from the relatively new north-west corner of White Hart Lane.

In the 2002–03 season, the section of terracing south of the main stand was covered and named in honour of defender Kurtis Townsend, son of then manager Troy Townsend, who had died whilst travelling to an away game the previous season and seats originally from the East Stand at Stamford Bridge were installed on the covered terrace. The main stand, the Kurtis Townsend stand and the floodlights were all replaced in the summer of 2015. In 2023 a new main stand seating 250 was built on the halfway line, while two 700-capacity terraces were installed behind each goal.

Cheshunt have had a groundshare agreement with Spartan South Midlands League Premier Division club FC Romania since 2011.

== Current squad ==
As of 1 October 2025

Note: Flags indicate national team as defined under FIFA eligibility rules; some limited exceptions apply. Players may hold more than one non-FIFA nationality.

Pos.	Nation	Player
GK	ENG	Preston Edwards
GK	BEL	Aymen Azaze
GK	ENG	Teddy Jefcoate
DF	ENG	Lordon Akolbire
DF	GBS	Raul da Silva
DF	MSR	Darion Furlong
DF	ENG	Sam Mvemba
DF	ENG	Charlie Naylor
DF	ENG	Bradley Roberts
DF	ENG	Jack Turner
DF	ENG	Riley Warmerdam
DF	ENG	Dequane Wilson-Braithwaite
MF	ENG	Sam Granville

Pos.	Nation	Player
MF	ENG	Alex Gibson-Hammond
MF	ENG	George Hunt
MF	ENG	Arthur Iontton
MF	ENG	Gucci Soulya-Osekanongo
FW	ENG	Jesse Effa
FW	ENG	Matthias Fanimo
FW	GUY	Connor Kurran-Browne
FW	IRL	George Nunn
FW	ENG	Isaac Okello
FW	ENG	Reon Smith-Kouassi
FW	CYP	Antonis Vasiliou
FW	ENG	Kieron Somers-Phillip
FW	SRB	Stefan Vukoje

== Management and support staff ==
As of 21 August 2025

Role	Name
Manager	(England) James Elliott
Assistant Manager	(England) Vacant
Assistant Manager	(England) Preston Edwards
First Team Analyst	(England) Danny Barnett
Physiotherapist	(England) Elliot McEwan

== Directors ==
As of 20 June 2023

Role	Name
Owner	Lee Williamson
Chairman	Dean Williamson
Executive Director	Glenn Williamson

== Managerial history ==
Listed by year in which they were appointed. Caretakers denoted by (C).

- 1946 (England) Harold Barnbury
- 1951 (England) Jim Ainsworth
- 1952 (England) Mike Doyle
- 1954 (England) Bert Taylor
- 1956 (England) Harry Lowe
- 1958 (England) Tom Jobson
- 1959 (England) Geoff Head
- 1960 (England) Bill Freeman
- 1961 (England) Fred Pointing
- 1961 (England) Ralph Wetton
- 1962 (England) Denis D'Arcy
- 1963 (England) Fred Pointing (C)
- 1964 (England) Tom Tyler
- 1965 (England) Dick Moss
- 1965 (Wales) Terry Medwin
- 1966 (England) Frank Davis (C)
- 1966 (England) Don Archer (C)
- 1967 (England) Les Picking
- 1970 (Republic of Ireland) Jimmy Quail
- 1972 (England) Bill Moye
- 1973 (England) John Drabwell
- 1978 (England) Gordon Sedgley
- 1980 (England) Tony Turley
- 1981 (England) John Drabwell
- 1982 (England) Dave Bidwell
- 1983 (England) John Drabwell
- 1985 (England) Barry Nevill
- 1986 (England) Dave Bidwell
- 1986 (England) Ian Priest
- 1988 (England) Steve Wilson (C)
- 1988 (England) Dave Bidwell (C)
- 1988 (England) Phil Maybury
- 1990 (England) Dave Wills (C)
- 1990 (England) John Drabwell (C)
- 1990 (England) Dave Bromley
- 1991 (England) Barry Crouch
- 1992 (England) Dave Bidwell
- 1994 (England) Gary Brooker
- 1995 (England) Kurt Davidson
- 1996 (England) John Ward (C)
- 1996 (England) Phil Maybury
- 1996 (Scotland) Dave Steedman
- 1998 (England) George Norman (C)
- 1998 (Cyprus) Tom Loizou
- 2000 (England) Troy Townsend
- 2001 (England) Paul Philips (C)
- 2002 (England) Andy Leese
- 2005 (Cyprus) Tom Loizou
- 2007 (England) Paul McGivern
- 2007 (England) Justin Moseley
- 2008 (England) Martin Grainger
- 2008 (Ghana) Gordon Boateng
- 2009 (England) Glyn Mason
- 2009 (Scotland) Bob Dearie
- 2011 (England) Glen Parry (C)
- 2011 (England) Dave Bricknell
- 2012 (England) Tony Faulkner
- 2013 (Northern Cyprus) Omer Riza (C)
- 2013 (Northern Cyprus) Omer Riza
- 2014 (England) Glen Alzapiedi
- 2015 (England) Paul Wickenden
- 2017 (England) Steve Newing
- 2018 (England) Craig Edwards
- 2024 (England) James Elliott/Preston Edwards (C)
- 2024 (England) Mel Gwinnett (C)

== Honours ==
- Isthmian League
  - Division Two champions 2002–03
- Athenian League
  - Division One champions 1967–68, 1975–76
  - Challenge Cup winners 1974–75, 1975–76
- Spartan League
  - Champions 1962–63
  - Challenge Cup winners 1963–64, 1992–93
- London League
  - Premier Division champions 1949–50
  - Division One champions, 1947–48, 1948–49
  - Division One Cup winners 1946–47
- Southern Amateur League
  - Section B champions 1920–21 (Note: Original club.)
- London Charity Cup
  - Winners 1973–74
- East Anglian Cup
  - Winners 1974–75
- Herts Charity Cup
  - Winners 2005–06, 2007–08, 2016–17
- Herts Charity Shield
  - Winners 1946–47, 1965–66
- Herts Senior Cup
  - Winners 2021–22
- Herts Senior Centenary Trophy
  - Winners 1991–92

== Records ==
- Best FA Cup performance: Fourth qualifying round, 1925–26, 1958–59, 1966–67, 1970–71, 1977–78
- Best FA Amateur Cup performance: Semi-finals, 1903–04
- Best FA Trophy performance: Fifth round, 2021–22
- Best FA Vase performance: Quarter-finals, 1981–82
- Record attendance: 5,000 vs Bromley, FA Amateur Cup second round, 28 January 1950
- Heaviest defeat: 10–0 vs Eton Manor, London League, 17 April 1956
- Most appearances: John Poole, 512 (1970–1976, 1979–1983)
- Most goals: Darrell Cox, 152 (1997–2005, 2007–2008 & 2010)
- Record transfer fee received: £10,000 from Peterborough United for Lloyd Opara, 2006

== See also ==
- Cheshunt F.C. players
- Cheshunt F.C. managers
