= Rugby Town F.C. (1945) =

English football club

Rugby Town
- Full name: Rugby Town Football Club
- Founded: 1946
- Dissolved: 1973
- Ground: Oakfield
Home colours

Rugby Town Football Club was an English football club based in Rugby, Warwickshire.

== History ==
The club was formed in 1946 under the name Rugby Town Amateurs. They joined the Central Amateur League in 1946, and were champions in 1947–48, after which they moved to the United Counties League. In 1950 they amalgamated with Rugby Oakfield and from then on the name was shortened to Rugby Town. For the 1950/1 season they joined the Birmingham Combination, in which they played until 1954 winning the championship that season which was the final season of that competition. They then joined The Birmingham & District League where they played for four seasons. For the 1958/9 season they joined the Southern League where they stayed for the rest of their existence. They were members of the Southern league Premier Division 1962-1966 and 1968/9. They were winners of The Birmingham Senior Cup in 1970/1.

In 1973 the owners of Oakfield refused to renew the lease of the ground thus putting the club out of business. The limited company was wound up that autumn.

Other clubs that have since used the name Rugby Town have no connection with this club.

== Colours ==
The club wore white shirts and black shorts.

== Ground ==
The club's original ground was at Thornfield; following the merger with Oakfield, it moved to the Oakfield ground, on Bilton Road.
