= Stevenage Town F.C. =

Stevenage Town
- Full name: Stevenage Town Football Club
- Founded: 1894
- Dissolved: 1968
- Ground: Broadhall Way, Stevenage
- 1967–68: Southern League Premier Division, 18/22

Stevenage Town Football Club was a football club based in Stevenage, Hertfordshire, England. The club existed from 1894 until 1968, after which Stevenage Athletic were established.

== History ==
The club were established in 1894 as Stevenage Town. They were renamed Stevenage Wanderers the following year, before merging with a club named Rovers, at which point the club reverted to their original name. They joined the Herts County League in 1899 but left after a single season. They rejoined in 1901 and were placed in the Northern Division. They left the league in 1925 when it was disbanded.

In 1951 the club left the Spartan League to become founder members of the Delphian League. In 1956 they merged with Stevenage Rangers to form Stevenage Football Club, before reverting to Stevenage Town four years later. They moved to Broadhall Way in 1961, and in 1963 they joined Division One of the Southern League. After finishing third in 1966–67 they were promoted to the Premier Division. They finished eighteenth in their first season in the Premier Division, their highest-ever league finish, but folded at the end of the season. A new club, Stevenage Athletic, was formed in their place.

== Honours ==
- Spartan League
  - Division One East champions 1948–49
- South Midlands League
  - Division Two champions 1930–31
- Delphian League
  - League Cup winners 1959–60
- Premier Midweek Floodlight League
  - Champions 1965–66
- North Herts Junior League
  - Champions 1919–20
- East Anglian Cup
  - Winners 1963–64
- Herts Charity Shield
  - Winners: 1932–33, 1950–51 (joint), 1953–54, 1960–61
- Hitchin Centenary Cup
  - Winners 1964–65, 1966–67

== Records ==
- Highest league position: Eighteenth in the Southern League Premier Division, 1967–68
- Best FA Cup performance: Third qualifying round second replay, 1966–67
- Best FA Amateur Cup performance: Second round, 1954–55
