= Hillingdon Borough F.C. =

Association football club in England

Coordinates: 51°35′13″N 0°26′33″W

Hillingdon Borough
- Full name: Hillingdon Borough Football Club
- Nicknames: The Hillmen, Boro
- Founded: 1872 (as Yiewsley); 1990 (reformed)
- Dissolved: 2026
- Ground: Middlesex Stadium, Ruislip
- Capacity: 3,587
- Chairman: Davinder Dhand
- Manager: Gary Pitt
- 2025–26: Combined Counties League Division One, 12th of 23 (resigned)
- Website: pitchero.com/clubs/hillingdonborough
Home colours	Away colours

Hillingdon Borough Football Club was a semi-professional football club based in Ruislip, in the London Borough of Hillingdon. The club was affiliated to the Middlesex County Football Association. Its name was revived in 1990 from the original club, which had been based in Yiewsley. They last played in the Combined Counties League Division One before folding in 2026.

== History ==
=== Historic club ===
The original club was founded as Yiewsley Football Club in 1872 after a meeting of eight local businessmen who met at the instigation of Frederick E. Clinch, a baker and owner of the Maythorn bakery on Fairfield Road, Yiewsley.

Yiewsley played friendly games with local clubs as Yiewsley F.C. until the 1885–86 season when they played under the name Yiewsley Rangers. This continued until the 1888–89 season when they played as Yiewsley Unity, Yiewsley Rangers and Yiewsley Star. From the start of 1890 they played as Yiewsley Star, returning to play as Yiewsley F.C from the 1893–94 season.

In the 1887–88 season Yiewsley (Rangers) were playing at Mr Elton's Meadow, West Drayton Green. Here they competed in the West Middlesex Challenge Cup for the first time, playing St Mary's, Acton on 5 November 1887. In the 1895–96 season Yiewsley joined the new West Middlesex League. For the first two seasons Yiewsley only fielded the reserve side in the league. In the 1898–99 season two West Middlesex leagues were run with Yiewsley's first team playing in the first division and the reserves in the second.

In the 1903–04 season poor conduct by players, officials and fans at West Middlesex League games against Harmondsworth on 5 December 1903 and against Hillingdon on 12 December caused Yiewsley's ground to be closed for six weeks by the Middlesex Football Association on 16 December and for Yiewsley were expelled from the West Middlesex League by the West Middlesex League Council on 17 December 1903.

In the 1904–05 season with the first team having to play only friendly games, Yiewsley Reserves were able to continue playing in the Uxbridge and District Junior League, which had been formed in July 1903 for the start 1903–04 football season. They finished the season as runners-up to Southall Athletic Reserves. In the 1905–06 season the Yiewsley first team were winners of the Uxbridge and District Junior League.

In the 1906–07 season Yiewsley were able to rejoin the West Middlesex League with the reserves playing in the Uxbridge and District League. Yiewsley would go on to win the West Middlesex League in the 1907–08 and 1908–09 seasons. Yiewsley entered the FA Cup competition for the first time in the 1908–09 season. Having received a bye in the preliminary round after the withdrawal of Reading Amateurs, Yiewsley were defeated in the first qualifying round 2–1 at home by Aylesbury United on 3 October 1908. In the same season Yiewsley competed in the FA Amateur Cup, the Middlesex Senior Cup, the Middlesex Senior Charity Cup, the Middlesex Junior Cup and the West Middlesex Cup.

Yiewsley were undefeated winners of the West Middlesex League in the 1910–11 season. In September 1911, with the West Middlesex League being suspended for the 1911–12 season, Yiewsley joined the Hounslow and District League. They also played their first team in the Uxbridge and District League, ending the season as undefeated champions of the league and winners of the inaugural Uxbridge and District League Cup. At the start of the 1912–13 season they were playing at Mr Sutton's Meadow, Edgar Road, Yiewsley. By early November 1912 the ground had been renamed Star Meadow. Yiewsley would end the 1912–13 season as champions of both the West Middlesex League and the Hounslow and District League. They would repeat this success in the 1913–14 season as well as being finalists in the 1913–14 West Middlesex Cup. Yiewsley were to enter senior football in the Great Western Suburban League in the 1914–15 season having been elected at the league's annual general meeting on 10 June 1914. However the league was suspended on 16 September 1914 due to the start of First World War.

With the recommencement of the Great Western Suburban League in the 1919–20 season Yiewsley opened the season on 31 August 1919 at home against Chesham United in front of 700 spectators. For the 1919–20 season Yiewsley played at Raab's Farm Meadow in Yiewsley. In August 1920 Yiewsley transferred its home ground to Mr White's Meadow at Trout Lane, but retained the name 'Star Meadow' from the Edgar Road ground. A friendly game against Arabian United took place on 28 August 1920 and Yiewsley's first league game at the new Star Meadow took place on 11 September in the Great Western Suburban League First Division against the 1st Grenadier Guards, ending in a 1–1 draw.

The 1920s proved to be a period of significant financial instability for Yiewsley. In February 1922 the Great Western Suburban League granted Yiewsley a loan of £20 to help with their debts, in particular their ground rent. At Yiewsley's annual meeting on 20 June 1923 it was reported that the football club ended the 1922–23 season just over £54 in debt. Despite their financial difficulties Yiewsley were able to finish runners-up in the Great Western Suburban League in the 1924–25 season. In the 1925–26 season Yiewsley finished third in the league but they ended the season with total receipts of only £325. In the 1926–27 season Yiewsley were admitted into the Spartan League Division II but by the November were in financial difficulties and withdrew from the league.

After the 1926 collapse Yiewsley returned to junior football, joining the Uxbridge and District League Division III in the 1927–28 season as Yiewsley Juniors. In the next season 1928–29 they finished as Division I champions. In the 1929–30 season, Yiewsley Juniors played in the Great Western Suburban League with reserve teams playing in the Uxbridge and District League Divisions I and III.

In the 1930–31 season Yiewsley changed their name to Yiewsley and West Drayton F.C. in honour of the recently created Yiewsley and West Drayton Urban District, finishing as joint winners in the Uxbridge and District League Division I with Cowley St Laurence and winners of the Junior Cup. They played the 1930–31 season at Thorney Meadow. For the following 1931–32 season Yiewsley and West Drayton moved to the Clarke's Meadow ground on Royal Lane. In the 1931–32 season they won the Uxbridge and District Premier League and Premier Cup, defeating Botwell Wanderers 5–3 in the final. In the 1932–33 season Yiewsley were runners up in the Uxbridge and District Premier League and defeated finalists in the Premier Cup; however, they won the Middlesex Junior Cup for the first time, defeating Pinner 6–4 in the replayed final. In the 1933–34 season Yiewsley and West Drayton joined the South-West Middlesex League Intermediate Division B and played their first home game of the season at Star Meadow, Trout Lane against N.P.L.(National Physical Laboratory) on 21 October 1933, winning 7–1. Yiewsley and West Drayton finished the 1933–34 season as league champions and winners of the Middlesex Intermediate Cup after winning 4–1 in a replayed final against Enfield Reserves.

In the 1934–35 season the club's name reverted to Yiewsley F.C. Having gained promotion in the previous season, they played in the Premier Division of the South-West Middlesex League. The 1935–36 season saw Yiewsley's last game at Star Meadow which took place on 18 April 1936 with a 10–1 win against F.G. Minter's. For the 1936–37 season Yiewsley's new ground was on the Evelyn's estate, Falling Lane, where they were granted a 21-year lease. To mark the change Yiewsley reverted to their old colours of Oxford and Cambridge blue instead of the black and white they had played in for the previous six seasons. Ten to twelve thousand people attended the Evelyn's Stadium opening ceremony and fete which took place on 22 August 1936. The first game of the 1936–37 season took place at Evelyn's on 29 August 1936 against Hayesco II in the South-West Middlesex Premier League, resulting in a 4–0 win. In the 1936–37 season Yiewsley won the South-West Middlesex Premier league, the Middlesex Intermediate Cup and the South-West Middlesex Victory Cup. In the 1937–38 season they won the South-West Middlesex Premier league and the Middlesex Intermediate Cup, winning the league by a clear eight points. In the 1938–39 season Yiewsley competed in the South-West Middlesex Premier League and the newly created Senior Division of the Middlesex County League, winning the Middlesex County League Senior Cup 1–0 against Deerfield and West Hendon on 3 May 1939.

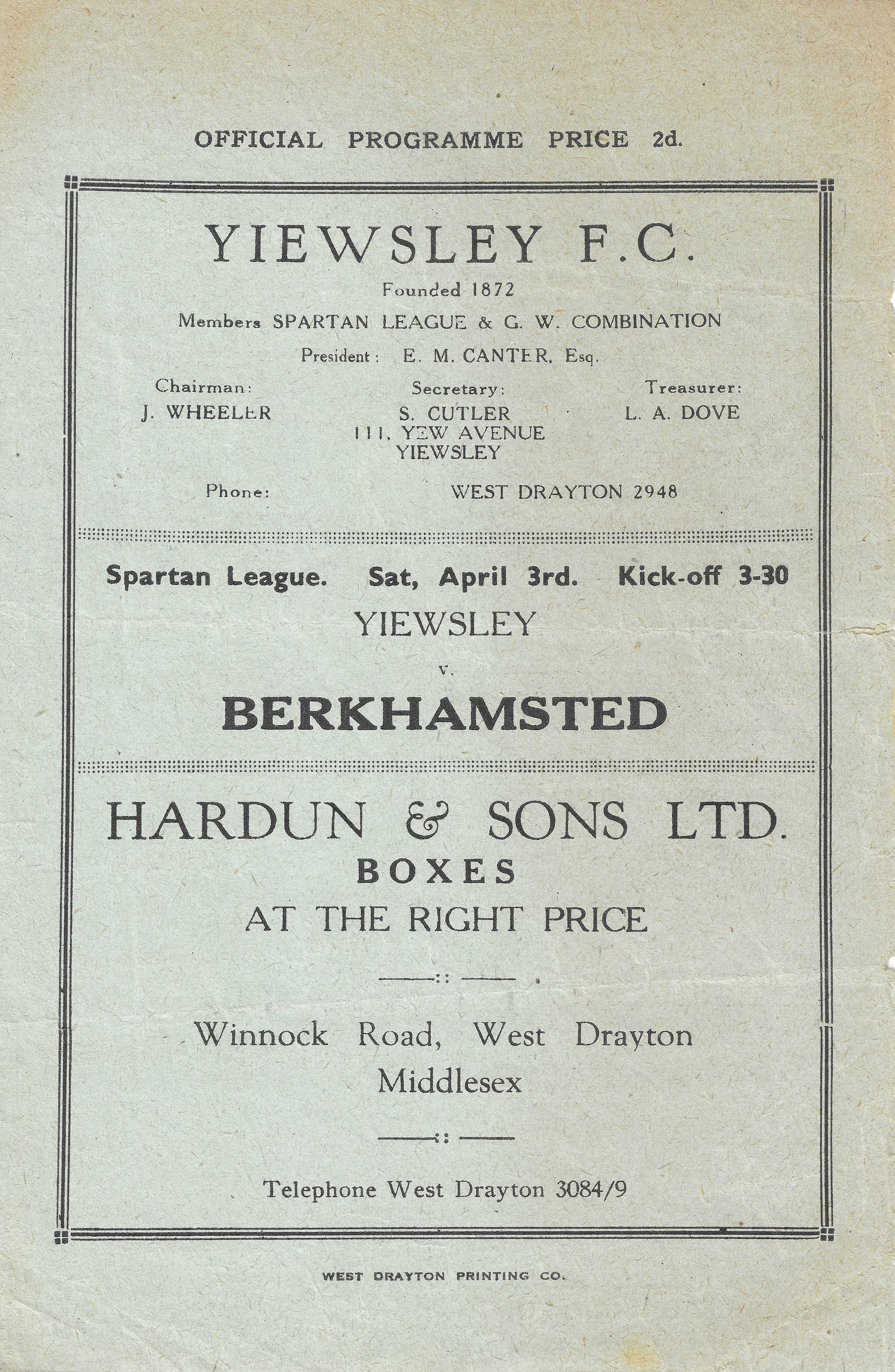
Yiewsley v Berkhamsted, Spartan League, 3 April 1948, Evelyn's Stadium

At the annual meeting of the Spartan league on 8 June 1939 Yiewsley were admitted for the second time. They were to play the 1939–40 season in the Spartan League Division II. Yiewsley started the season with two away wins, defeating Apsley Reserves 8–4 on 26 and Harrow Town 4–2 on 30 August. However, the declaration of war on 3 September 1939 caused the league to be abandoned after its general meeting on 14 September 1939. In early October 1939 Yiewsley were transferred to the Western No 2 Group which was renamed the West Middlesex Combination League on 17 October 1939. Yiewsley's first game in the new league was away at Pinner on 21 October 1939 which ended in a 5–5 draw. Yiewsley ended the 1939–40 season as runners-up to Edgware Town. For the 1940–41 season the West Middlesex Combination League was replaced by the Middlesex Senior League. However, Yiewsley tendered its resignation from the league on 9 September 1940 because of being unable to field a competitive team, as players and supporters were working weekends as part of the war effort. In the 1941–42 to 1943–44 seasons Yiewsley were able to field a team in the Middlesex Senior league and in the 1944–45 season also competed in the Great Western Combination League. Yiewsley joined the Great Western Combination League again when it was reestablished in the 1946–47 season and played in the league until the 1950–51 season.

In 1945–46 Yiewsley were finally successful in completing a season in the Spartan League. They competed in Diversion I Western Section, opening the season at Aylesbury on 15 September 1945 with a 5–3 defeat. Having finished runners-up in the 1948–49 season, in the 1949–50 season Yiewsley finished winners of the league, gaining promotion to the Spartan League Premier Division. They followed this by going on to win the championship play-off game against the Eastern Section winners Hertford Town 6–1. In the following 1950–51 season they won the Spartan Premier Division at the first attempt, clinching the title with a 2–1 win at Aylesbury, who finished the season in third place. In March 1951 Yiewsley were one of the 14 clubs who founded the Delphian League which was to commence from the following 1951–52 season. Yiewsley's first game in the new league took place on 18 August against Wembley at Vale Farm ending in a 1–0 defeat.

In the 1954–55 season Yiewsley joined the Corinthian League, opening the season with a 1–0 win against Edgware Town on 21 August at their new ground, Leas Stadium in front of 2,600 spectators. Yiewsley had wanted a new ground for several years due to the limited facilities at the leased Evelyn's Stadium. In early 1946 a site was purchased. A Yiewsley F.C. 'New Ground Fund' was established to pay for the purchasing loan with many local individuals and businesses contributing. A 'Sports and Fete day' took place at Evelyn's on 23 July 1946 raising £320 for the fund. This brought the total raised to £600 towards a target of £1000. However it wasn't until the 1951–52 season that work began on the site of Leas Stadium. It was situated west of the Evelyn's stadium along Falling Lane and was named after a house there called 'The Leas'. Construction of the 10,000 capacity stadium took three years to complete at a cost of £7000.

Yiewsley topped the Corinthian League in their third season, 1956–57. In the FA Cup that season Yiewsley drew 2–2 with Third Division Gillingham at the Leas Stadium in the first round. The game was watched by Yiewsley's record home crowd of 5400 spectators. Gillingham went on to defeat Yiewsley 2–0 at Priestfield in the replay.

Yiewsley were elected to the Southern League at the league's annual general meeting on 31 May 1958. The club turned professional and played in the South-East zone of the league in the 1958-59 season. From the 1959–60 season Yiewsley played in the Southern League Division One. In November 1960 Jackie Milburn formerly of Newcastle United and England signed for Yiewsley, soon becoming Player-manager. Under Milburn's tenure Yiewsley achieved their highest league position, finishing ninth in the 1961–62 season. He left in March 1963 when offered the manager's job at First Division Ipswich Town.

On 1 May 1964, the F.A. Council granted permission for Yiewsley to change their name to Hillingdon Borough F.C. This was done to reflect the local government reorganisation in London that was to see the formation of the London Borough of Hillingdon on 1 April 1965. The change of name saw their fortunes change, as in their second season they were promoted to the Premier Division of the Southern League after finishing runners up. Their most successful period followed over the next five years. In 1968–69 they finished runners-up to Cambridge United. In the following 1969–70 season, they reached the third round proper of the FA Cup beating Wimbledon and Luton Town before losing to Sutton United 4–1 in a replay at Gander Green Lane. In the 2–1 win against Luton in the second round, the Leas Stadium had its highest official attendance with 9,033 spectators. In the 1970–71 season, Hillingdon reached the FA Trophy final at Wembley playing Telford United in front of 29,500 spectators. Hillingdon led 2–0 at the interval but Telford staged a second half comeback scoring two goals in the last seven minutes to win 3–2.

These achievements were all under Jimmy Langley (left-back for Fulham, Queens Park Rangers and England), who was player-manager between 1967 and 1971. Langley had been educated at Evelyn's school, next to Yiewsley's Evelyn's Stadium. At the age of fourteen he was the youngest player to play for the club. In the F.A. Trophy Final on 1 May 1971, Langley, known as a gentleman footballer, became the then oldest man to appear in a Cup Final at Wembley at the age of 42. Other notable managers of the club included Barry Fry, latterly of Birmingham City and Peterborough United.

The club failed to build on the success of the late 1960s and early 1970s. The 1980s saw Hillingdon entering financial difficulties and subsequent financial collapse. Hillingdon Borough's final game was at the Leas on 30 April 1983 against Dover ending with a 2–1 win. The club was wound up and the Leas Stadium sold in the summer of 1983. In the 1983–84 and 1984–85 seasons the club was able to continue playing under the name of Hillingdon F.C. However the final game at Leas Stadium was held on 23 April 1985 against Chatham Town in front of 350 spectators ending in a 1–0 defeat.

In the 1985–86 season Hillingdon merged with Burnham to form Burnham & Hillingdon F.C. playing home games at Burnham's Wymers Wood Road ground. The club ran for two seasons with this name before changing back to Burnham and continuing to play in the Southern league.

Leas Stadium had been sold to property developers who built a housing estate on the land. They honoured the club's history by naming the roads Leacroft Close, Newcombe Rise, Cousins (sic) Close and Milburn Drive.

=== Modern club ===
The club was reformed in 1990, taking over Breakspear Road from Ruislip Park, who were disbanded. The newly named club then joined the Premier Division of the Spartan League for the start of the 1990–91 campaign. The club would then go on to finish Runners-up twice before the league merged with the South Midlands League to form the Spartan South Midlands Football League. The club was placed in the Premier South Division.

In 2006, Hillingdon Borough reached the FA Vase final at St. Andrews, Birmingham, after an 11-game qualification route starting in the competition as early as the 2nd qualifying round. In the final of the FA Vase the club lost 3–1 to Cheshire club Nantwich Town. Also in that year they finished 2nd in the Spartan South Midlands League Premier Division, losing on goal difference to Oxford City. However they were promoted due to continued restructuring of non-league football, joining the Southern League Division One South & West. During the 2007–08 season, captain Danny Tilbury led Steve Ringrose's side to lift the Errea Cup (Southern League Cup) with a 4–1 aggregate win against Premier side Clevedon Town. Following the departure of Steve Ringrose the club was transferred to the Isthmian League Division One North. The club struggled under new manager Steve Hale and in their first season in the Isthmian League they finished bottom of the division and were relegated back to the Spartan South Midlands League in 2009.

In recent years the club have had little stability in the managerial department and on and off the field. When Gamdoor Dhaliwal resigned as chairman the club were on the brink of liquidation until local businessman Mick Harris stepped in to save the club. Gary Meakin, aged 26 years old, took over in 2010 and was in the process of building a competitive team before swapping Hillingdon for Northwood in March 2011. Jesse Smith, an experienced coach on the Middlesex scene, was appointed as Meakin's successor before his departure in 2012 and achieved a 10th-place finish and a cup final in his only season in charge. Then it was the turn of 2005 Football Icon winner Sam Hurrell to take charge in September 2012, then only 24 years of age, alongside co-manager Jason O'Connor.

Following relegation from the Spartan South Midlands League Premier Division in 2015, the club appointed former Harefield United boss Ian Crane as their new manager. Crane had most recently been manager at A.F.C. Hayes before leaving in December 2014.

On 17 January 2017, the club released a statement via their Twitter account that the club would be pulling out of the division due to monetary troubles. However, former player Yannick Bolasie has since contacted the club, with the support of Everton, to help with the club's financial situation. At the end of the 2020–21 season they were transferred to Division One of the Combined Counties League.

On 8 April 2026, the club announced it would be resigning from the Combined Counties Football League following the conclusion of the 2025–26 season season.

== Ground ==
The original club played at a number of grounds:

- 1887–98: Mr Elton's Meadow, West Drayton Green and Mr E.A. Whites Meadow, Trout Lane, Yiewsley
- 1898 to 1901: Fox Lane Meadow, Cowley
- 1901 to 1902: Hall Meadow (Mr Elton's Meadow), West Drayton
- 1902 to 1905: Mr E.A. Whites Meadow, Trout Lane, Yiewsley
- 1905 to 1907: Mr Day's Meadow, Edgar Road, Yiewsley
- 1909 to 1910: Mr Sutton's Meadow, Edgar Road, Yiewsley
- 1911 to 1912: Mr E.A. Whites Meadow, Trout Lane, Yiewsley
- 1912 to 1914: Star Meadow, (Mr Sutton's Meadow) Edgar Road, Yiewsley
- 1919 to 1920: Raab's Farm Meadow, Yiewsley
- 1920 to 1927: Star Meadow, (Mr E.A White's 40 Acre meadow), Trout Lane, Yiewsley
- 1930 to 1931: Thorney Meadow, Thorney
- 1931 to 1933: Clarke's Meadow, Royal Lane, Yiewsley
- 1933 to 1936: Star Meadow, Trout Lane, Yiewsley
- 1936 to 1954: Evelyn's stadium, Colham Green
- 1954 to 1985: The Leas stadium, Falling Lane, Yiewsley

The current club play at the Middlesex Stadium, Breakspear Road, Ruislip, Middlesex, HA4 7SB. The stadium is also home to the Hillingdon Borough Under-23's and U18's midweek sides

== Non-playing staff ==
As of 5 February 2026

Position	Staff
Manager	Gary Pitt
Assistant Manager	Dave Roberts
Coach	Louis Blincko
Coach	Haitham Gabril
Physio	Rebeca Garbovan
Physio	Alyssa Hill
Performance Coach	Benjamin Jones

Source: https://www.pitchero.com/clubs/hillingdonborough/contact

== Managerial history ==
- Dave Richardson 1990-1991
- Malcolm Bridges 1991-1992
- Tony Choules 1993-1994
- John Morris 1994-1996
- Glyn Owen 1996-1998
- Stuart Leavy 1998-1999
- Steve Hawkins 1999-2001
- Steve Ringrose Jan 2001- June 2008
- Rob Burton June 2008- October 2008
- Steve Hale November 2008-March 2010
- Gary Meakin March 2010-March 2011
- Steve Hawkins March 2011- May 2011
- Paul Lawrence June 2011- November 2011
- Jesse Smith November 2011- September 2012
- Sam Hurrell September 2012 -July 2014
- Jason O’Connor July 2014-January 2015
- Mick Byron January 2015- May 2015
- Ian Crane June 2015-October 2017
- Roy Coleman November 2017-May 2018
- Kurt Herbert June 2018-June 2019
- Ciprian Pintilie July 2019-June 2021
- Anthony Obeng July 2021-Feb 2022
- Carlan Edgar July 2022-June 2023
- Ali Abdulkadir July 2023-February 2024
- Pedro Pesqueira February 2024- May 2025
- Gary Pitt May 2025-

== Honours ==
=== Historic club ===
- Corinthian League
  - Champions 1956–57
- Spartan League
  - Premier Division champions 1950-51
  - Western Section champions 1949–50
- Middlesex County League
  - League Cup winners 1938–39
- South-West Middlesex League
  - Champions 1936–37, 1937–38
  - Intermediate Division B champions 1933–34
  - Victory Cup winners 1936–37
- Hounslow and District League
  - Champions 1912–13, 1913–14
- West Middlesex League
  - Champions 1907–08, 1908–09, 1910–11, 1912–13, 1913–14
- Uxbridge and District Junior League
  - Champions 1905–06, 1911–12, 1930–31, 1931–32
  - League Cup winners 1911–12, 1930–31, 1931–32
- Middlesex Intermediate Cup
  - Winners 1933–34, 1936–37, 1937–38
- Middlesex Junior Cup
  - Winners 1932–33

=== Modern club ===
- Southern League
  - League Cup winners 2007–08
- Spartan League
  - League Cup winners 1996–97

== Club records ==
=== Historic club ===
- Highest League Position: 2nd in Southern League 1968–69
- FA Cup best performance: Third round 1969–70
- FA Trophy best performance: Finalists 1970–71

=== Modern club ===
- Highest league position: 16th in Southern League Division One South & West, 2006–07
- FA Cup best performance: Third qualifying round, 2007–08
- FA Trophy best performance: Second qualifying round, 2007–08
- FA Vase best performance: Finalists 2005–06
- Record attendance: 723 vs Bury Town, FA Vase semi-final, 9 April 2006
- Most league appearances: Ryan Fenton, 178 2003-2008
- Most wins in a league season : 28 wins, 2005-06 season
- Most goals in a league season : 121 goals, 2014-15 season
- Most points in a league season : 88 points, 2005-06 season
- Most goals in a season: Dave Lawrence, 19 goals 2005-06 season
