= List of Yeovil Town F.C. seasons =

Chart showing the progress of Yeovil Town FC in League and Non-League football from 1988 to 2023.

Yeovil Town Football Club, an association football club based in Yeovil, Somerset, was founded in 1895. They were elected to play in the Southern League for the 1922–23 season. After fifty-one seasons in the Southern League, they were elected to play in newly formed Football Conference in 1979.

Yeovil were promoted to the Football League Third Division in 2003, after 108 years in non-league football, and the 2004–05 season saw them promoted to the third tier of English football. Yeovil's first and only play-off success came in the 2012–13 season, when they beat Brentford 2–1 at Wembley Stadium to win promotion to the Championship, and the second tier for the first time.

Since their promotion to the Football League in 2003, Yeovil have spent 1 season in the second tier of English football, 9 seasons in the third tier and 6 seasons in the fourth tier. The table details Yeovil Town's achievements in senior first team competition from the 1895–96 season to the end of the most recently completed season.

== Key ==
Key to league record:

- P – Played
- W – Games won
- D – Games drawn
- L – Games lost
- F – Goals for
- A – Goals against
- Pts – Points
- Pos – Final position

Key to colours and symbols:

1st or W	Winners
2nd or RU	Runners-up
↑	Promoted
↓	Relegated
♦	Top league scorer in division

Key to divisions:

- Somerset – Somerset Senior League
- Dorset – Dorset District League
- Wiltshire – Wiltshire League
- Western – Western League
- Bristol – Bristol Charity League
- Southern – Southern League
- London – London Combination
- Alliance – Alliance Premier League
- Isthmian – Isthmian Premier League
- Conference – Football Conference
- Division 3 - Football League Third Division
- League 2 - Football League Two
- League 1 - Football League One
- Championship - Football League Championship

Key to rounds:

- GS – Group stage
- QPR - Extra-prelimanary pre-qualifying
- QR1 – First qualifying round, etc.
- R1 – First round, etc.
- R1 (S) – First round Southern section, etc.
- QF (S) – Quarter-finals Southern section
- SF – Semi-finals
- SF (S) – Semi-finals Southern section
- RU – Runners-up
- W – Winners
- DNE – Did not enter

Details of abandoned competitions are shown in italics and appropriately footnoted.

== Seasons ==
Results of league and cup competitions by season
Season	Division (Note: Divisions are sorted according to their level within the English football league system at the time.)	P	W	D	L	F	A	Pts	Pos	FA Cup	League Cup (Note: The Football League Cup competition started in the 1960–61 season and Yeovil first entered in the 2003–04 season.)	Competition	Result	Name	Goals	Average attendance	Ref
Season	League									FA Cup	League Cup	Other		Top scorer (Note: Includes goals scored in all competitions.)		Average attendance	Ref
1895–96	Somerset	12	3	3	6	16	22	9	5th	—	—	—	—	—	—		
1896–97	Somerset	14	9	4	1	37	10	22	1st	—	—	FA Amateur Cup Somerset Premier Cup	QR3 R1	—	—		
1897–98	Somerset	10	5	2	3	18	20	12	2nd	—	—	FA Amateur Cup Somerset Premier Cup	QR2 SF	—	—		
1898–99	Somerset Dorset	10 12	4 5	2 3	4 4	21 23	14 18	10 13	3rd 3rd	—	—	Somerset Premier Cup	RU	—	—		
1899–1900	Somerset Dorset	16 12	12 4	1 1	3 7	69 14	22 25	25 11	2nd 6th	QPR	—	FA Amateur Cup	QPR	—	—		
1900–01	Somerset Dorset	10 12	4 5	2 1	4 6	21 20	18 26	10 11	5th 4th	QPR	—	FA Amateur Cup	QPR	—	—		
1901–02	Somerset Wiltshire	6 16	5 7	1 0	0 9	31 31	19 42	11 14	1st 6th	QR3	—	FA Amateur Cup Somerset Premier Cup	QR4 SF	Harvey Vassall	27		
1902–03	Somerset Wiltshire	8 20	2 8	1 5	5 7	10 44	12 41	5 21	4th 6th	QR3	—	—	—	Harvey Vassall	10		
1903–04	Somerset Wiltshire	14 20	4 11	3 5	7 4	33 44	43 36	11 27	6th 3rd	QR2	—	—	—	CP Ewans	25		
1904–05	Somerset Wiltshire	10 20	5 10	2 4	3 6	38 56	15 39	12 24	3rd 3rd	QR2	—	—	—	—	—		
1905–06	Wiltshire	22	7	5	10	50	56	19	8th	QR1	—	—	—	Peaty	24		
1906–07	Wiltshire	22	5	5	12	30	34	15	10th	QR1	—	—	—	Peaty	14		
1907–08	Somerset Dorset	10 10	7 4	1 1	2 4	35 23	19 41	15 9	2nd ?	QR1	—	Somerset Premier Cup	RU	Johnny Hayward	41		
1908–09	Somerset Dorset	8 12	4 8	2 3	3 1	16 32	9 14	10 19	2nd 1st	QPR	—	Somerset Premier Cup	SF	Johnny Hayward	33		
1909–10	Somerset Dorset S	10 16	3 10	1 4	6 4	15 39	18 18	7 24	5th 2nd	QR4	—	Somerset Premier Cup	R2	Johnny Hayward	22		
1910–11	Somerset Dorset S	8 18	4 10	1 3	3 5	20 38	12 18	9 23	3rd 3rd	QR1	—	Somerset Premier Cup	RU	Johnny Hayward	31		
1911–12	Somerset Dorset	12 16	9 10	2 2	1 4	28 37	8 17	20 20	1st 2nd	QPR	—	Somerset Premier Cup	SF	Johnny Hayward	23		
1912–13	Somerset Sec A Dorset	12 16	9 9	2 2	1 5	42 39	12 25	20 20	1st 3rd	QR2	—	Somerset Premier Cup	W	Johnny Hayward	36		
1913–14	Somerset Dorset	8 18	4 11	1 1	3 6	20 47	18 24	9 23	3rd 3rd	QPR	—	Somerset Premier Cup	RU	Johnny Hayward	30		
1914–19	Competitive football was suspended until after the First World War.																
1919–20	Western Div 2 ↑ Dorset Wiltshire Somerset	14 16 20 14	7 9 7 7	2 2 5 2	5 5 8 5	41 48 45 31	34 23 46 18	16 20 19 16	5th 5th 7th 4th	QPR	—	Somerset Premier Cup	RU	Johnny Hayward	52		
1920–21	Western Div 1 Dorset Somerset S	30 18 8	13 7 6	6 2 1	11 9 1	52 36 20	46 36 5	32 16 13	7th 6th 1st	QPR	—	Somerset Premier Cup	R1	Johnny Hayward	38		
1921–22	Western Div 1 Dorset Somerset Bristol	14 16 16 4	10 7 6 3	2 3 3 0	2 6 7 1	26 36 29 10	9 25 33 4	22 17 15 7	1st 4th 5th 1st	QPR	—	Somerset Premier Cup	R2	Johnny Hayward	50		
1922–23	Southern Eng Western Bristol	38 16 14	10 7 6	6 5 0	22 4 8	56 28 30	104 19 32	26 19 12	17th 3rd 6th	QR2	—	Somerset Premier Cup	R1	Johnny Hayward	30		
1923–24	Southern W	34	25	3	6	71	30	53	1st	QR3	—	Somerset Premier Cup	R2	Johnny Hayward	38		
1924–25	Southern W	38	15	10	13	49	50	40	11th	R1	—	—	—	Johnny Hayward	29		
1925–26	Southern W Western Div 1	26 18	9 7	8 7	9 4	43 33	48 27	26 21	7th 4th	QR4	—	—	—	Harry Scott	34		
1926–27	Southern W Western Div 1	26 22	9 10	5 1	12 11	49 48	66 44	23 21	12th 7th	QR4	—	—	—	Tommy Lowes	39		
1927–28	Southern W Western Div 1	30 20	11 12	7 2	12 6	64 56	57 44	29 26	9th 3rd	QR1	—	—	—	Peter Scott	65		
1928–29	Southern W Western Div 1	26 14	11 3	2 4	13 8	49 19	57 42	24 8	10th 8th	R1	—	—	—	Maurice White	40		
1929–30	Southern W Western Div 1	28 14	12 10	7 2	9 2	65 32	63 13	47 22	5th 1st	QR3	—	Somerset Premier Cup	W	William Whitehead	24		
1930–31	Western Div 1 London Div 2	12 26	7 16	2 3	3 7	43 79	27 46	16 35	2nd 2nd	QR1	—	—	—	Trevor Edmunds	54		
1931–32	Southern W Western Div 1 London Div 2	24 14 22	16 8 11	4 3 3	4 3 8	65 42 56	31 26 44	36 19 25	1st 2nd 3rd	R2		—		Cecil Pemberton	65		
1932–33	Southern W Western Div 1 London Div 2	20 16 14	11 10 8	2 0 2	7 6 4	59 51 35	44 31 28	24 20 18	5th 3rd 2nd	R2	—	—	—	Wilf Lewis	63		
1933–34	Southern W Southern C Western Div 1	20 18 12	10 7 5	1 4 3	9 7 4	35 34 22	39 38 21	21 18 13	5th 4th 4th	QR4	—	—	—	Louis Page	23		
1934–35	Southern W Southern C Western Div 1	16 20 12	11 8 9	2 1 1	3 11 2	49 45 38	18 51 21	24 17 19	1st 10th 1st	R3	—	—	—	Joe Taylor	66		
1935–36	Southern W Southern C Western Div 1	16 20 10	5 3 1	3 5 3	8 12 6	31 40 22	35 75 30	13 11 5	7th 11th 6th	R1	—	Somerset Premier Cup	SF	Dave Halliday	22		
1936–37	Southern Western Div 1	30 8	15 5	3 1	12 2	77 23	69 12	33 11	6th 2nd	R2	—	Somerset Premier Cup	RU	Dave Halliday	47		
1937–38	Southern Western Div 1	34 8	14 5	14 1	6 2	72 20	45 16	42 11	4th 2nd	R3	—	Southern League Cup Somerset Premier Cup	RU W	J. Kirk	25		
1938–39	Southern Western Div 1	44 10	22 6	10 2	12 2	85 32	70 20	54 14	5th 2nd	R3	—	Southern League Cup Somerset Premier Cup	GS W	Arthur Graham	43		
1939–40	Southern W	14	7	2	5	30	24	16	4th	—	—	—	—	Arthur Graham	15		
1940–45	Competitive football was suspended until after the Second World War.																
1945–46	Southern	18	7	1	10	57	52	18	6th	R1	—	Southern League Cup Somerset Premier Cup	GS RU	George Dewis	20		
1946–47	Southern	32	19	6	7	100	49	44	4th	R1	—	Southern League Cup Somerset Premier Cup	RU W (Note: Shared with Bath City.)	Les Gore	25		
1947–48	Southern	34	12	11	11	56	50	35	8th	QR4	—	Southern League Cup Somerset Premier Cup	RU W	Reg Swinfen	29		
1948–49	Southern	42	19	9	14	71	64	47	8th	R5	—	Southern League Cup Somerset Premier Cup	W RU	Eric Bryant	55		
1949–50	Southern	46	29	7	10	104	45	65	3rd	R3	—	Southern League Cup Somerset Premier Cup	QR W	Cliff Mansley	28		
1950–51	Southern	44	13	15	16	72	72	41	13th	QR4	—	Southern League Cup Somerset Premier Cup	R1 W	Joe Rae	36		
1951–52	Southern	42	12	11	19	56	76	35	17th	QR4	—	Southern League Cup Somerset Premier Cup	R1 SF	Hugh Colvan	15		
1952–53	Southern	42	11	10	21	75	99	32	18th	R1	—	Southern League Cup Somerset Premier Cup	R1 R1	Billy Lunn	25		
1953–54	Southern	42	20	8	14	87	76	48	3rd	R1	—	Southern League Cup Somerset Premier Cup	R1 W	Billy Lunn	24		
1954–55	Southern	42	23	9	10	105	66	55	1st	QR4	—	Southern League Cup Somerset Premier Cup	W W	Jim Fraser	33		
1955–56	Southern	42	23	9	10	98	55	55	3rd	R1	—	Southern League Cup Somerset Premier Cup	RU W	Frank Fidler	49		
1956–57	Southern	42	14	11	17	83	85	39	16th	R1	—	Southern League Cup Somerset Premier Cup	SF W (Note: Shared with Bristol City.)	Marcel Gaillard	26		
1957–58	Southern	42	16	9	17	70	84	41	13th	R3	—	Southern League Cup Somerset Premier Cup	R2 SF	Don Travis	26		
1958–59	Southern SE	32	17	8	7	60	41	42	4th	R2	—	Southern League Cup Somerset Premier Cup	R5 SF	Terry McConnon	36		
1959–60	Southern Prem	42	17	8	17	81	73	42	11th	QR4	—	Southern League Cup Somerset Premier Cup	R1 R1	Danny Paton	18		
1960–61	Southern Prem	42	23	9	10	109	54	55	3rd	R2	—	Southern League Cup Somerset Premier Cup	W RU	Dave Taylor	59		
1961–62	Southern Prem	42	23	8	11	97	59	54	4th	R1	—	Southern League Cup Somerset Premier Cup	R5 W	Dave Taylor	41		
1962–63	Southern Prem	40	15	10	15	64	54	40	11th	R2	—	Southern League Cup Somerset Premier Cup	R1 W	Dennis Coughlin	25		
1963–64	Southern Prem	42	29	5	8	76	93	36	1st	R3	—	Southern League Cup Somerset Premier Cup	R5 RU	Dave Taylor	48		
1964–65	Southern Prem	42	18	14	10	76	55	50	4th	QR4	—	Southern League Cup Somerset Premier Cup	R4 W	Malcolm Hirst	24		
1965–66	Southern Prem	42	17	11	14	91	70	45	9th	R1	—	Southern League Cup Somerset Premier Cup	W R2	Chris Harding	25		
1966–67	Southern Prem	42	14	14	14	66	72	42	14th	R1	—	Southern League Cup Somerset Premier Cup	R4 RU	Dave Taylor	36		
1967–68	Southern Prem	42	16	12	14	45	43	44	12th	R1	—	Southern League Cup Somerset Premier Cup	SF RU	Chris Weller	16		
1968–69	Southern Prem	42	16	13	13	52	50	45	8th	R1	—	Southern League Cup Somerset Premier Cup	R3 W (Note: Shared with Frome Town.)	Dave Taylor	22		
1969–70	Southern Prem	42	25	7	10	78	48	57	2nd	R1	—	FA Trophy Southern League Cup Somerset Premier Cup	R1 R3 R1	Dave Taylor	22		
1970–71	Southern Prem	42	25	7	10	66	31	57	1st	R3	—	FA Trophy Southern League Cup Somerset Premier Cup	SF R3 RU	Brian Grey	22		
1971–72	Southern Prem	42	18	11	13	67	51	47	7th	QR4	—	FA Trophy Southern League Cup Southern League Championship Cup Somerset Premier Cup	SF R1 W R2	Terry Cotton	30		
1972–73	Southern Prem	42	21	14	7	67	31	56	2nd	R2	—	FA Trophy Southern League Cup Somerset Premier Cup	R1 R2 W	John Brown	26		
1973–74	Southern Prem	42	13	20	9	45	39	46	9th	QR4	—	FA Trophy Southern League Cup Somerset Premier Cup	R1 R1 SF	John Clancy	11		
1974–75	Southern Prem	42	21	9	12	64	34	51	3rd	QR4	—	FA Trophy Southern League Cup Somerset Premier Cup	R1 R4 SF	Dick Plumb	28		
1975–76	Southern Prem	42	21	12	9	68	35	54	2nd	R1	—	FA Trophy Southern League Cup Somerset Premier Cup	R1 RU W	Dick Plumb	33		
1976–77	Southern Prem	42	15	16	11	54	42	46	7th	QR3	—	FA Trophy Southern League Cup Southern League Championship Cup Anglo-Italian Cup Somerset Premier Cup	R2 RU W GS RU	Ken Brown	20		
1977–78	Southern Prem	42	14	14	14	57	49	42	12th	QR1	—	FA Trophy Southern League Cup Somerset Premier Cup	R1 R2 SF	Dick Plumb	14		
1978–79	Southern Prem	42	15	16	11	59	49	46	9th	R1	—	FA Trophy Southern League Cup Somerset Premier Cup	R4 RU W	Terry Cotton; Dave Platt	26	1,179	
1979–80	Alliance	38	13	10	15	46	49	36	12th	R3	—	FA Trophy Somerset Premier Cup	R3 SF	Clive Green	19	1,588	
1980–81	Alliance	38	14	6	18	60	64	34	14th	R2	—	FA Trophy Bob Lord Challenge Trophy Somerset Premier Cup	R2 R1 RU	Clive Green	23	1,385	
1981–82	Alliance	42	14	11	17	56	68	53	11th	R1	—	FA Trophy Bob Lord Challenge Trophy Somerset Premier Cup	R1 R1 R3	Dave Platt	19	1,162	
1982–83	Alliance	42	11	7	24	63	99	35	20th	R2	—	FA Trophy Bob Lord Challenge Trophy Somerset Premier Cup	R1 R1 R3	Andy Bell	27	1,140	
1983–84	Alliance	42	12	8	22	55	77	35	20th	R1	—	FA Trophy Bob Lord Challenge Trophy Somerset Premier Cup	R2 SF SF	Mike Doherty	25	1,115	
1984–85	Alliance ↓	42	6	11	25	41	87	25	22nd	R1	—	FA Trophy Bob Lord Challenge Trophy Somerset Premier Cup	QR3 R3 RU	Phil James	13	1,296	
1985–86	Isthmian	42	28	7	7	92	48	91	2nd	R1	—	FA Trophy Isthmian League Cup Somerset Premier Cup	QR3 R1 RU	John McGinlay	26	1,761	
1986–87	Isthmian	42	28	8	6	71	27	92	2nd	QR4	—	FA Trophy Isthmian League Cup Somerset Premier Cup	R2 SF SF	Paul Randall	19	1,887	
1987–88	Isthmian ↑	42	24	9	9	66	34	81	1st	R3	—	FA Trophy Isthmian League Cup Somerset Premier Cup	R2 W R2	Paul Randall	24	2,282	
1988–89	Conference	40 (Note: Following Newport County's expulsion from the Football Conference, their results were expunged, meaning the league season was reduced from 42 games to 40.)	15	11	14	68	67	56	9th	R2	—	FA Trophy Bob Lord Challenge Trophy Isthmian Championship Shield Somerset Premier Cup	R2 R1 W R3	Guy Whittingham	18	2,396	
1989–90	Conference	42	17	12	13	62	54	63	7th	R1	—	FA Trophy Bob Lord Challenge Trophy Somerset Premier Cup	R1 W R1	Robbie Carroll; Mickey Spencer	16	2,244	
1990–91	Conference	42	13	11	18	58	58	50	14th	R1	—	FA Trophy Bob Lord Challenge Trophy Somerset Premier Cup	R3 R1 R3	Robbie Carroll; Paul Wilson	13	2,649	
1991–92	Conference	42	11	14	17	40	49	47	15th	R2	—	FA Trophy Bob Lord Challenge Trophy Somerset Premier Cup	R4 RU RU	Mickey Spencer	30	2,103	
1992–93	Conference	42	18	12	12	59	49	66	4th	R3	—	FA Trophy Bob Lord Challenge Trophy Somerset Premier Cup	R1 R3 R2	Mickey Spencer	20	2,615	
1993–94	Conference	42	14	9	19	49	62	51	19th	R2	—	FA Trophy Bob Lord Challenge Trophy Somerset Premier Cup	R1 RU SF	Mickey Spencer	19	2,491	
1994–95	Conference ↓	42	8	14	20	50	71	37	22nd	QR4	—	FA Trophy Bob Lord Challenge Trophy Somerset Premier Cup	R2 R2 R2	Paul Wilson	15	1,746	
1995–96	Isthmian	42	23	11	8	83	51	80	4th	QR4	—	FA Trophy Isthmian League Cup Somerset Premier Cup	R1 R2 R2	Warren Patmore	27	2,032	
1996–97	Isthmian ↑	42	31	8	3	83	34	101	1st	QR4	—	FA Trophy Isthmian League Cup Somerset Premier Cup	R1 R2 W	Warren Patmore	29	2,779	
1997–98	Conference	42	17	8	17	73	63	59	11th	QR4	—	FA Trophy Bob Lord Challenge Trophy Somerset Premier Cup	R1 R3 W	Owen Pickard	25	2,457	
1998–99	Conference	42	20	11	11	88	44	71	5th	R3	—	FA Trophy Bob Lord Challenge Trophy Somerset Premier Cup	R5 R1 R1	Warren Patmore	26	2,408	
1999–2000	Conference	42	18	10	14	60	63	64	7th	R1	—	FA Trophy Bob Lord Challenge Trophy Somerset Premier Cup	R5 R1 R2	Warren Patmore	17	2,294	
2000–01	Conference	42	24	8	10	73	50	80	2nd	R3	—	Football League Trophy FA Trophy Bob Lord Challenge Trophy Somerset Premier Cup	R1 (S) R5 R3 R2	Warren Patmore	22	3,416	
2001–02	Conference	42	19	13	10	66	53	70	3rd	QR4	—	Football League Trophy FA Trophy Somerset Premier Cup	R2 (S) W (Note: Beat Stevenage Borough 2–0 in the 2002 FA Trophy Final to win the club's first major trophy.) R2	Adam Stansfield	16	2,872	
2002–03	Conference ↑	42	28	11	3	100	36	95	1st	R1	—	Football League Trophy FA Trophy Somerset Premier Cup	R1 (S) R6 RU (Note: Lost 2–1 to Taunton Town in the 2002 Somerset Premier Cup final.)	Kirk Jackson	20	4,741	
2003–04	Division 3	46	23	5	18	70	57	74	8th	R3	R1	Football League Trophy	R2 (S)	Gavin Williams	13	6,197	
2004–05	League 2 (Note: The Third Division was renamed League Two after Football League reorganisation.) ↑	46	25	8	13	90	65	83	1st	R4	R2	Football League Trophy	R1 (S)	Phil Jevons (Note: Scored 27 goals in Football League Two.)	29 ♦	6,320	
2005–06	League 1	46	15	11	20	54	62	56	15th	R2	R2	Football League Trophy	R1 (S)	Phil Jevons	16	6,668	
2006–07	League 1	46	23	10	13	55	39	79	5th (Note: Beat Nottingham Forest 5–4 on aggregate after extra-time in the semi-final before losing 2–0 to Blackpool in the 2007 Football League One play-off final.)	R1	R1	Football League Trophy	R2 (S)	Wayne Gray	12	5,765	
2007–08	League 1	46	14	10	22	38	59	52	18th	R1	R1	Football League Trophy	QF (S)	Lloyd Owusu	11	5,468	
2008–09	League 1	46	12	15	19	41	66	51	17th	R1	R2	Football League Trophy	R1 (S)	Gavin Tomlin	9	4,223	
2009–10	League 1	46	13	14	19	55	59	53	15th	R1	R1	Football League Trophy	R1 (S)	Dean Bowditch	10	4,664	
2010–11	League 1	46	17	11	19	56	66	59	14th	R2	R1	Football League Trophy	R1 (S)	Dean Bowditch	15	4,291	
2011–12	League 1	46	14	12	20	59	80	54	17th	R2	R1	Football League Trophy	R2 (S)	Andy Williams	17	3,984	
2012–13	League 1 ↑	46	23	8	15	71	56	77	4th (Note: Promoted to Football League Championship via the play-offs, beating Sheffield United 2–1 on aggregate in the semi-final and Brentford 2–1 in the 2013 Football League One play-off final.)	R1	R2	Football League Trophy	SF (S)	Paddy Madden (Note: Scored 23 goals in Football League One, with 1 for Carlisle United.)	23 ♦	4,240	
2013–14	Championship ↓	46	8	13	25	44	75	37	24th	R4	R2	—	—	Ishmael Miller	10	6,616	
2014–15	League 1 ↓	46	10	10	26	36	75	40	24th	R3	R1	Football League Trophy	R1 (S)	James Hayter; Gozie Ugwu	5	4,346	
2015–16	League 2	46	11	15	20	43	59	48	19th	R3	R1	Football League Trophy	SF (S)	Ryan Bird; Harry Cornick; François Zoko	8	3,936	
2016–17	League 2	46	11	17	18	49	64	50	20th	R1	R2	EFL Trophy	QF	François Zoko	13	3,567	
2017–18	League 2	46	12	12	22	59	75	48	19th	R4	R1	EFL Trophy	SF	François Zoko	15	2,941	
2018–19	League 2 ↓	46	9	13	24	41	66	40	24th	R1	R1	EFL Trophy	GS	Alex Fisher	8	2,953	
2019–20	National	37	17	9	11	61	44	60	4th (Note: The season was suspended on 16 March 2020 and later concluded prematurely in April 2020 due to the COVID-19 pandemic, with league positions and promotions decided on a points-per-game basis, Yeovil finished the season in 4th position in the National League with a 1.62 PPG and qualified for the play-offs, but lost 2–0 to Barnet in the play-off quarter-finals. While the Somerset Premier Cup along with all Somerset FA competitions was cancelled.)	R1	—	FA Trophy Somerset Premier Cup	R3 QF	Rhys Murphy	20	2,907	
2020–21	National	42 (Note: Dover Athletic's results were expunged after failing to meet fixture obligations, meaning the National League season was reduced from 44 games to 42.)	15	7	20	58	68	52	16th	R2	—	FA Trophy	R3	Rhys Murphy	14	n/a	
2021–22	National	44	15	14	15	43	46	59	12th	R3	—	FA Trophy Somerset Premier Cup	R4 W	Tom Knowles	11	2,422	
2022–23	National ↓	46	7	19	20	35	60	40	22nd	QR4	—	FA Trophy Somerset Premier Cup	R3 QF	Alex Fisher; Malachi Linton; Matt Worthington	5	2,730	
2023–24	National S ↑	46	29	8	9	81	49	95	1st	R2	—	FA Trophy Somerset Premier Cup	R2 R2	Jordan Young	16	3,916	
2024–25	National	46	15	11	20	51	60	56	18th	QR4	—	FA Trophy Somerset Premier Cup	R3 R2	Aaron Jarvis	8	3,200	
2025–26	National	46	15	6	25	48	68	51	16th	QR4	—	FA Trophy Somerset Premier Cup	QF R1	Luke McCormick	8	2,918	
