= Jim Kelso =

Scottish footballer

Personal information
- Full name: James Kelso
- Date of birth: 8 December 1910
- Place of birth: Inchinnan, Scotland
- Date of death: 13 March 1987 (aged 76)
- Place of death: Newport, Wales
- Height: 5 ft 6 in (1.68 m)
- Position: Defender

Senior career*
Years	Team	Apps	(Gls)
- Helensburgh
1929–1933	Dumbarton	141	(5)
1933–1934	Bradford (Park Avenue)	11	(0)
1934–1935	Port Vale	15	(0)
1935–1938	Newport County	119	(1)
1938–1939	Cardiff City	41	(0)
1945–1946	Swindon Town	0	(0)
- Ebbw Vale
Total		327+	(6+)
- * Club domestic league appearances and goals

James Kelso (8 December 1910 – 13 March 1987) was a Scottish footballer who played as a defender for Helensburgh, Dumbarton, Bradford Park Avenue, Port Vale, Newport County, Cardiff City, Swindon Town, and Ebbw Vale.

== Career ==
Kelso played for Helensburgh, Dumbarton and Bradford (Park Avenue) before joining Port Vale in June 1934. He made his debut in a 4–1 win over Southampton at the Old Recreation Ground on 3 September 1934 and started the next nine Second Division games, but lost his place to Ernest Breeze in November 1934 and rarely featured in the rest of the 1934–35 season. He was given a free transfer in May 1935 and moved on to Welsh club Newport County, who struggled in the lower half of the Third Division South table in 1935–36, 1936–37, and 1937–38. He then left Rodney Parade for league rivals Cardiff City, and made 41 league appearances at Ninian Park in 1938–39. During World War II he guested for Bristol City, Bath City, Liverpool and Swansea Town. He later played for Swindon Town and Ebbw Vale, before becoming a scout at Blackpool.

== Career statistics ==
Appearances and goals by club, season and competition
Club	Season	League			FA Cup		Other		Total	
Club	Season	Division	Apps	Goals	Apps	Goals	Apps	Goals	Apps	Goals
Bradford Park Avenue	1933–34	Second Division	11	0	1	0	0	0	12	0
Port Vale	1934–35	Second Division	15	0	0	0	0	0	15	0
Newport County	1935–36	Third Division South	42	0	1	0	1	0	44	0
Newport County	1936–37	Third Division South	37	1	2	0	0	0	39	1
Newport County	1937–38	Third Division South	40	0	4	0	1	0	45	0
Newport County	Total		119	1	7	0	2	0	128	1
Cardiff City	1938–39	Third Division South	41	0	6	0	1	0	48	0
Swindon Town	1945–46	–	0	0	2	0	0	0	2	0
