= Louis Page (footballer, born 1899) =

English footballer (1899–1959)

Personal information
- Full name: Louis Antonio Page
- Date of birth: 27 March 1899
- Place of birth: Bootle cum Linacre, Liverpool, Lancashire, England
- Date of death: 11 October 1959 (aged 60)
- Place of death: Prenton, Birkenhead, Cheshire, England
- Height: 5 ft 8 in (1.73 m)
- Position: Forward

Senior career*
Years	Team	Apps	(Gls)
- Everton
- South Liverpool
1919–1922	Stoke	21	(1)
1922–1925	Northampton Town	122	(24)
1925–1932	Burnley	248	(111)
1932	Manchester United	12	(0)
1932–1933	Port Vale	18	(2)
1933–1935	Yeovil & Petters United		
Total		421	(138)

International career
1927	England	7	(1)

Managerial career
- 1933–1935: Yeovil & Petters United
- 1935–1937: Newport County
- 1939–1940: Glentoran
- 194?–194?: Carlton
- 1945–1953: Swindon Town
- 1953–1956: Chester
- * Club domestic league appearances and goals

Louis Antonio Page (27 March 1899 – 11 October 1959) was an England international football player and football manager. His brothers Tom, Jack and Willie were also professional footballers.

He spent his youth with Everton and South Liverpool before beginning his professional career with Stoke in 1919. After the "Potters" won promotion out of the Second Division, he moved on to Northampton Town in 1922. Three years later, he moved up to the First Division with Burnley. He scored 111 goals in 248 league games for the "Clarets" before he was sold to Manchester United for a £1,000 fee in March 1932. Seven months later, he moved on to Port Vale before ending his playing career in the Football League in the summer of 1933.

He started his management career with Yeovil & Petters United and led the club to the Southern League West Section and Western League Division 1 titles in 1934–35. He then returned to the Football League with Newport County. He later took charge at Glentoran before he was put in charge at Swindon Town following the conclusion of World War II. He spent eight years in charge of the Third Division South club before he spent three years in charge at Chester, who were struggling at the foot of the Third Division North table.

== Early and personal life ==
Louis Antonio Page was born on 27 March 1899 in Bootle cum Linacre, Liverpool, Lancashire. He was the youngest of ten children to Robert William and Jane (née Galvin); his father was born in Calcutta and worked as a crane driver at the Liverpool docks. Three brothers – Tom, Jack and Willie – also played professional football. He married Lily Tinsley in 1920 and had six children: Lilian (born and died 1920), Louis (born 1921), Philimenia (born 1925), Mary (born and died 1928), Derek A. (born 1931) and Terence (born 1942).

== Club career ==
Page began his senior career with Merseyside clubs Everton and South Liverpool. He entered professional football with Stoke during the 1919–20 season, scoring his first senior goal on 13 December, in a 2–1 defeat to Birmingham at St Andrew's. However, he featured just eight times in 1920–21 and then once in 1921–22, as the "Potters" won promotion out of the Second Division.

He left the Victoria Ground to sign with Northampton Town of the Third Division South. The "Cobblers" finished eighth in 1922–23 and 1923–24, and ninth in 1924–25. He scored 24 goals in 122 league games at the County Ground.

Page transferred to Burnley, who finished one place and one point above the First Division relegation zone in 1925–26. He wrote himself into the club's record books on 10 April 1926, when he scored six goals in a 7–1 win over Birmingham. He finished as the club's top scorer in 1925–26 with 26 goals. He scored 15 goals in 1926–27 to again become the club's top scorer, as the "Clarets" achieved a top-five finish. They dropped to 19th in 1927–28, two places and one point above the relegation zone. They again finished 19th in 1928–29, but were seven points above the drop zone this time. Burnley were relegated in 1929–30, having attained a lower goal average than Sheffield United. They then finished eighth in the Second Division in 1930–31 and 19th in 1931–32. He made 248 league appearances, scoring 111 goals, during his time at Turf Moor.

Page joined Walter Crickmer's Second Division side Manchester United for a £1,000 fee in March 1932. He played nine games at the end of the 1931–32 season and three games at the start of the 1932–33 season, before falling out of favour under new secretary Scott Duncan and moving on to league rivals Port Vale in October 1932. He played 19 games in all competitions during the 1932–33 season, falling out of favour in March 1933. He was not kept on at the Old Recreation Ground beyond the campaign, and so Page left the Football League to forge a career in management.

== International career ==
Page featured for England seven times in 1927, alongside England and Everton great Dixie Dean. He played four British Home Championship games and three friendlies, and scored against Belgium on 1 May 1927; his goal came in the 63rd minute, in what was a 9–1 victory.

=== Caps ===
Cap	Date	Venue	Opposition	Att.	Result	Goals
1	12 February 1927	Wrexham	Wales	16,100	(D) 3–3	0
2	2 April 1927	Glasgow	Scotland	111,214	(W) 2–1	0
3	11 May 1927	Brussels	Belgium	35,000	(W) 9–1	1
4	21 May 1927	Luxembourg	Luxembourg	5,000	(W) 5–2	0
5	26 May 1927	Paris	France	25,000	(W) 6–0	0
6	22 October 1927	Belfast	Northern Ireland	30,000	(L) 0–2	0
7	28 November 1927	Millwall	Wales	32,089	(L) 1–2	0

== Management career ==
=== Yeovil & Petters United ===
Page's first managerial post was with Yeovil & Petters United in summer 1933, also being registered as a player. He finished as the club's top scorer in 1933–34 with 23 goals. In the 1934–35 season, Yeovil topped both the Southern League West Section and Western League Division 1 tables.

=== Newport County ===
Page was appointed manager at Welsh club Newport County on 7 June 1935. The club finished 21st in the 22 team Third Division South in 1935–36, but successfully applied for re-election. Newport then moved up to 19th in the 1936–37 campaign, finishing two places and two points above the re-election zone. He was sacked on 9 September 1937, a few games into the 1937–38 season; his successor, Billy McCandless, led the club to a 16th-place finish in the Third Division South.

After leaving Newport he became trainer-coach at Glentoran in 1939–40, as the "Glens" finished third in the Irish League. He later served as manager of Liverpool-based Carlton F.C.

=== Swindon Town ===
When league football resumed after the Second World War, he was appointed manager of Swindon Town. Page was forced to build a completely fresh team, and so Swindon's fourth-place finish in the Third Division South in 1946–47 was seen as a highly respectable achievement. The "Robins" slumped to 16th place the following season – just two points off the bottom spot. They did though knock Burnley out of the FA Cup, before being beaten in the fifth round by Southampton. In 1948–49, Swindon again finished fourth, without ever challenging for the promotion spot.

Swindon then finished 14th in 1949–50, 17th in 1950–51, 16th in 1951–52, and 18th in 1952–53. Page always had to deal with a shoestring budget at the County Ground, and was forced to sell many of his top players. Page was relieved of his duties at the end of the 1952–53 season, and was handed £500 in compensation.

=== Chester ===
He became manager of Chester in 1953. The "Seals" finished bottom of the Third Division North in 1953–54. The Sealand Road club again finished last in 1954–55, before rising to 17th in 1955–56. He later worked as a scout for Leicester City.

== Career statistics ==
Appearances and goals by club, season and competition
Club	Season	League			FA Cup		Total	
Club	Season	Division	Apps	Goals	Apps	Goals	Apps	Goals
Stoke	1919–20	Second Division	12	1	0	0	12	1
Stoke	1920–21	Second Division	8	0	0	0	8	0
Stoke	1921–22	Second Division	1	0	0	0	1	0
Stoke	Total		21	1	0	0	21	1
Northampton Town	1922–23	Third Division South	39	5	1	0	40	5
Northampton Town	1923–24	Third Division South	42	5	5	2	47	7
Northampton Town	1924–25	Third Division South	41	14	1	0	42	14
Northampton Town	Total		122	24	7	2	129	26
Burnley	1925–26	First Division	41	26	2	0	43	26
Burnley	1926–27	First Division	36	13	3	2	38	15
Burnley	1927–28	First Division	41	22	1	0	42	22
Burnley	1928–29	First Division	39	17	3	2	42	19
Burnley	1929–30	First Division	32	15	1	0	33	15
Burnley	1930–31	Second Division	29	13	0	0	29	13
Burnley	1931–32	Second Division	30	5	1	0	31	5
Burnley	Total		248	111	11	4	259	115
Manchester United	1931–32	Second Division	9	0	0	0	9	0
Manchester United	1932–33	Second Division	3	0	0	0	3	0
Manchester United	Total		12	0	0	0	12	0
Port Vale	1932–33	Second Division	18	2	1	0	19	2
Career total			421	138	19	6	440	144

== Honours ==
=== As a player ===
Stoke

- Football League Second Division second-place promotion: 1921–22

England

- British Home Championship: 1926–27 (shared)

=== As player-manager ===
Yeovil & Petters United

- Southern League West Section: 1934–35
- Western League Division 1: 1934–35
- Somerset Premier Cup: 1935

== Baseball ==
Louis Page and his three brothers were all England baseball Internationals. Louis played in the annual International against Wales eight times between 1925 and 1933, 1928 being the exception, the last five as captain.
