= Billy Lunn =

Billy Lunn may refer to:

- Billy Lunn, musician in The Subways
- Billy Lunn (footballer) (1923–2000), Northern Irish footballer

== See also ==
- William Lunn (disambiguation)
