= 1934–35 Welsh Cup =

Tournament details
- Country: Wales
- Teams: 60

Final positions
- Champions: (England) Tranmere Rovers
- Runners-up: (England) Chester

Tournament statistics
- Matches played: 76
- Goals scored: 342 (4.5 per match)

The 1934–35 FAW Welsh Cup is the 54th season of the annual knockout tournament for competitive football teams in Wales.

== Key ==
League name pointed after clubs name.

- B&DL - Birmingham & District League
- FL D2 - Football League Second Division
- FL D3N - Football League Third Division North
- FL D3S - Football League Third Division South
- MWL - Mid-Wales Football League
- SFL - Southern Football League
- WLN - Welsh League North
- WLS D1 - Welsh League South Division One
- WLS D2 - Welsh League South Division Two
- W&DL - Wrexham & District Amateur League

== First round ==
Tie no	Home	Score	Away
1	Blaenau Ffestiniog	2–2*	Portmadog
2	Bethesda Victoria	w/o	Llanfairfechan (WLN)
3	Llandudno	1–1	Flint Town (WLN)
replay	Flint Town (WLN)	8–2	Llandudno
4	Abergele (WLN)	2–2	Llanddulas (WLN)
replay	Llanddulas (WLN)	0–1	Abergele (WLN)
5	Gwersyllt (W&DL)	2–3	Caergwrle (W&DL)
6	Brymbo Green (W&DL)	3–2*	Mold Alexandra
7	Johnstown	2–3	Druids (W&DL)
8	Stryd Isa	1–2	Cross Street Gwersyllt (W&DL)
9	Llay Welfare (W&DL)	2–5	Llanerch Celts (W&DL)
10	Aberystwyth Town (MWL)	3–2	Welshpool (MWL)
11	Towyn (MWL)	6–2	Aberystwyth University College (MWL)
12	Aberdovey (MWL)	3–0	Bala Town)
13	Caersws (MWL)	3–4	Llanidloes Town (MWL)
14	Newtown (MWL)	5–2	Machynlleth (MWL)
15	Rhayader	5–1	Builth Wells
16	Llandrindod Wells	0–1	Knighton
17	Blaina Town	2–6	Milford Haven

== Second round ==
15 winners form the First round plus three new clubs. Mold Alexandra and Milford Haven get a bye to the Third round.

Tie no	Home	Score	Away
1	Portmadog	4–0	Llanfairfechan (WLN)
2	Abergele (WLN)	1–3	Flint Town (WLN)
3	Holt	5–2	Caergwrle (W&DL)
4	Cross Street Gwersyllt (W&DL)	3–3	Druids (W&DL)
replay	Druids (W&DL)	3–3	Cross Street Gwersyllt (W&DL)
replay	Cross Street Gwersyllt (W&DL)	6–1	Druids (W&DL)
5	Llanerch Celts (W&DL)	11–0	Crosville
6	Aberdovey (MWL)	4–7	Aberystwyth Town (MWL)
7	Dolgelley Albion (MWL)	0–0	Towyn (MWL)
replay	Towyn (MWL)	2–1	Dolgelley Albion (MWL)
8	Newtown (MWL)	1–1	Rhayader
replay	Rhayader	2–1	Newtown (MWL)
9	Llanidloes Town (MWL)	9–0	Knighton

== Third round ==
Nine winners from the Third round plus Mold Alexandra. Milford Haven get one more bye.

Tie no	Home	Score	Away
1	Portmadog	1–1	Flint Town (WLN)
replay	Flint Town (WLN)	3–1	Portmadog
2	Mold Alexandra	4–1	Holt
3	Llanerch Celts (W&DL)	6–0	Cross Street Gwersyllt (W&DL)
4	Towyn (MWL)	0–4	Aberystwyth Town (MWL)
5	Llanidloes Town (MWL)	2–0	Rhayader

== Fourth round ==
Five winners from the Third round, Milford Haven plus 14 new clubs.

Tie no	Home	Score	Away
1	Aberdare Town (WLS D1)	0–0	Aberaman (WLS D1)
replay	Aberaman (WLS D1)	1–3	Aberdare Town (WLS D1)
2	Barry (WLS D1 & SFL)	6–2	Cardiff Corinthians (WLS D1)
3	Ebbw Vale (WLS D1)	2–0*	Lovell's Athletic (WLS D1)
4	Llanelly (WLS D1)	2–5	Milford Haven
5	Penrhiwceiber (WLS D1)	2–2	Troedyrhiw (WLS D1)
replay	Troedyrhiw (WLS D1)	6–0	Penrhiwceiber (WLS D1)
6	Shrewsbury Town (B&DL)	2–0	Kidderminster Harriers (B&DL)
7	Rhyl (B&DL)	1–1	Mold Alexandra
replay	Mold Alexandra	1–2	Rhyl (B&DL)
8	Llanerch Celts (W&DL)	2–2	Oswestry Town (B&DL)
replay	Oswestry Town (B&DL)	0–1	Llanerch Celts (W&DL)
9	Flint Town (WLN)	w/o	Colwyn Bay
10	Llanidloes Town (MWL)	5–1	Aberystwyth Town (MWL)

== Fifth round ==
Seven winners from the Fourth round plus Porth United. Barry, Lovell's Athletic and Llanerch Celts get a bye to the Sixth round.

Tie no	Home	Score	Away
1	Troedyrhiw (WLS D1)	4–0	Aberdare Town (WLS D1)
2	Milford Haven	4–1	Porth United (WLS D1)
3	Llanidloes Town (MWL)	1–3	Shrewsbury Town (B&DL)
4	Flint Town (WLN)	0–0	Rhyl (B&DL)
replay	Rhyl (B&DL)	0–2	Flint Town (WLN)

== Sixth round ==
Four winners from the Fifth round, Barry, Llanerch Celts, Lovell's Athletic and nine new clubs.

Tie no	Home	Score	Away
1	Lovell's Athletic (WLS D1)	1–1	Barry (WLS D1 & SFL)
replay	Barry Town (WLS D1 & SFL)	0–3	Lovell's Athletic (WLS D1)
2	Cardiff City (FL D3S)	3–2	Newport County (FL D3S)
3	Troedyrhiw (WLS D1)	3–5	Shrewsbury Town (B&DL)
4	Milford Haven	1–4	Swansea Town (FL D2)
5	Chester (FL D3N)	5–1	Bangor City (B&DL)
6	New Brighton (FL D3N)	1–1	Southport (FL D3N)
replay	Southport (FL D3N)	1–4	New Brighton (FL D3N)
7	Flint Town (WLN)	0–5	Tranmere Rovers (FL D3N)
8	Llanerch Celts (W&DL)	2–3	Wrexham (FL D3N)

== Seventh round ==
Tie no	Home	Score	Away
1	New Brighton (FL D3N)	0–0	Shrewsbury Town (B&DL)
replay	Shrewsbury Town (B&DL)	4–4	New Brighton (FL D3N)
replay	New Brighton (FL D3N)	0–2	Shrewsbury Town (B&DL)
2	Tranmere Rovers (FL D3N)	1–1	Lovell's Athletic (WLS D1)
replay	Lovell's Athletic (WLS D1)	5–6	Tranmere Rovers (FL D3N)
3	Swansea Town (FL D2)	6–0	Wrexham (FL D3N)
4	Cardiff City (FL D3S)	2–2	Chester (FL D3N)
replay	Chester (FL D3N)	3–0	Cardiff City (FL D3S)

== Semifinal ==
Swansea Town and Chester played at Wrexham.

Tie no	Home	Score	Away
1	Swansea Town (FL D2)	0–5	Chester (FL D3N)
2	Shrewsbury Town (B&DL)	0–3	Tranmere Rovers (FL D3N)

== Final ==
Final were held in Wrexham.

Tie no	Home	Score	Away
1	Chester (FL D3N)	0–1	Tranmere Rovers (FL D3N)
