= 1933–34 Welsh Cup =

Tournament details
- Country: Wales
- Teams: 60

Final positions
- Champions: (England) Bristol City
- Runners-up: (England) Tranmere Rovers

Tournament statistics
- Matches played: 72
- Goals scored: 315 (4.38 per match)

The 1933–34 FAW Welsh Cup is the 53rd season of the annual knockout tournament for competitive football teams in Wales.

== Key ==
League name pointed after clubs name.

- B&DL - Birmingham & District League
- FL D2 - Football League Second Division
- FL D3N - Football League Third Division North
- FL D3S - Football League Third Division South
- MWL - Mid-Wales Football League
- SFL - Southern Football League
- WLN - Welsh League North
- WLS D1 - Welsh League South Division One
- W&DL - Wrexham & District Amateur League

== First round ==
Tie no	Home	Score	Away
1	Portmadog	4–1	Llanddulas (WLN)
2	Llandudno	1–4	Flint Town (WLN)
3	Rhyl Corinthians	4–4	Bethesda Victoria
replay	Bethesda Victoria	7–4	Rhyl Corinthians
4	Llanfairfechan	1–0	Holyhead Town
5	Cross Street Gwersyllt (W&DL)	0–1	Llay Welfare (W&DL)
6	Mold Alexandra (W&DL)	3–2*	Gwersyllt (W&DL)
7	Vron United (W&DL)	1–3	Llanerch Celts (W&DL)
8	Brymbo Green (W&DL)	5–4	Druids (W&DL)
9	Welshpool (MWL)	9–0	Llanfyllin
10	Newtown (MWL)	6–0	Caersws (MWL)
11	Aberystwyth University College (MWL)	0–6	Machynlleth (MWL)
12	Aberystwyth Town (MWL)	3–2	Llanidloes Town (MWL)
13	Bala Town	2–1	Dolgelley Albion
14	Towyn (MWL)	1–3	Aberdovey (MWL)
15	Builth Wells	2–2	Llandrindod Wells
replay	Llandrindod Wells	0–2	Builth Wells
16	Milford Haven	0–2	Blaina Town

== Second round ==
14 winners from the First round plus two new clubs. Porthmadog and Blaina get a bye to the Third round.

Tie no	Home	Score	Away
1	Bethesda Victoria	1–1	Bettisfield (WLN)
replay	Bettisfield (WLN)	1–4	Bethesda Victoria
2	Llanfairfechan	0–4	Flint Town (WLN)
3	Llanerch Celts (W&DL)	6–1	Brymbo Green (W&DL)
4	Gwersyllt (W&DL)	1–2	Llay Welfare (W&DL)
5	Bala Town	1–5	Aberdovey (MWL)
6	Knighton	5–2	Builth Wells
7	Aberystwyth Town (MWL)	2–0	Newtown (MWL)
8	Machynlleth (MWL)	2–0	Welshpool (MWL)

== Third round ==
Seven winners from the Second round, Porthmadog, Blaina plus 13 new clubs. Bethesda Victoria get a bye.

Tie no	Home	Score	Away
1	Knighton	2–0	Machynlleth (MWL)
2	Aberdovey (MWL)	0–2	Aberystwyth Town (MWL)
3	Bangor City (B&DL)	1–1	Portmadog (WLN)
replay	Portmadog	0–6	Bangor City (B&DL)
4	Rhyl (B&DL)	6–3	Llanerch Celts (W&DL)
5	Llay Welfare (W&DL)	1–5	Colwyn Bay
6	Oswestry Town (B&DL)	3–5	Flint Town (WLN)
7	Llanelly (WLS D1 & SFL)	1–1	Lovell's Athletic (WLS D1)
replay	Lovell's Athletic (WLS D1)	2–1	Llanelly (WLS D1 & SFL)
8	Aberaman (WLS D1)	9–1	Blaina Town
9	Troedyrhiw (WLS D1)	2–0	Cardiff Corinthians (WLS D1)
10	Barry (WLS D1 & SFL)	5–0	Ebbw Vale (WLS D1)
11	Penrhiwceiber (WLS D1)	1–0	Porth United (WLS D1)

== Fourth round ==
8 winners from the Third round plus Bethesda Victoria and one new club - Merthyr Town. Barry, Penrhiwceiber and Bangor City get a bye to the Fifth round.

Tie no	Home	Score	Away
1	Bethesda Victoria	0–4	Colwyn Bay
2	Rhyl (B&DL)	5–0	Flint Town (WLN)
3	Aberystwyth Town (MWL)	7–2	Knighton
4	Aberaman (WLS D1)	1–2	Troedyrhiw (WLS D1)
5	Merthyr Town (WLS D1) & (SFL)	4–2	Lovell's Athletic (WLS D1)

== Fifth round ==
Five winners from the Fourth round plus Barry, Penrhiwceiber and Bangor City.

Tie no	Home	Score	Away
1	Barry (WLS D1 & SFL)	1–1	Troedyrhiw (WLS D1)
replay	Troedyrhiw (WLS D1)	4–1	Barry (WLS D1 & SFL)
2	Merthyr Town (WLS D1) & (SFL)	7–0	Penrhiwceiber (WLS D1)
3	Rhyl (B&DL)	4–0	Colwyn Bay
4	Aberystwyth Town (MWL)	1–4	Bangor City (B&DL)

== Sixth round ==
Four winners from the Fifth round plus 12 new clubs.

Tie no	Home	Score	Away
1	Chester (FL D3N)	2–1	Swansea Town (FL D2)
2	Southport (FL D3N)	1–3	Tranmere Rovers (FL D3N)
3	New Brighton (FL D3N)	3–2	Troedyrhiw (WLS D1)
4	Rhyl (B&DL)	1–1	Port Vale (FL D2)
replay	Port Vale (FL D2)	2–0	Rhyl (B&DL)
5	Bristol Rovers (FL D3S)	2–0	Wrexham (FL D3N)
6	Cardiff City (FL D3S)	2–2	Bristol City (FL D3S)
replay	Bristol City (FL D3S)	1–0	Cardiff City (FL D3S)
7	Bangor City (B&DL)	3–1	Merthyr Town (WLS D1) & (SFL)
8	Newport County (FL D3S)	2–2	Crewe Alexandra (FL D3N)
replay	Crewe Alexandra (FL D3N)	4–5	Newport County (FL D3S)

== Seventh round ==
Tie no	Home	Score	Away
1	Newport County (FL D3S)	1–1	Tranmere Rovers (FL D3N)
replay	Tranmere Rovers (FL D3N)	5–2	Newport County (FL D3S)
2	New Brighton (FL D3N)	2–2	Bristol City (FL D3S)
replay	Bristol City (FL D3S)	2–1	New Brighton (FL D3N)
3	Bangor City (B&DL)	1–0	Chester (FL D3N)
4	Bristol Rovers (FL D3S)	3–3	Port Vale (FL D2)
replay	Port Vale (FL D2)	2–1	Bristol Rovers (FL D3S)

== Semifinal ==
Bristol City and Port Vale played at Chester.

Tie no	Home	Score	Away
1	Bangor City (B&DL)	1–6	Tranmere Rovers (FL D3N)
2	Bristol City (FL D3S)	1–0	Port Vale (FL D2)

== Final ==
Final was held at Wrexham, replay was held at Chester.

Tie no	Home	Score	Away
1	Tranmere Rovers (FL D3N)	1–1	Bristol City (FL D3S)
replay	Tranmere Rovers (FL D3N)	0–3	Bristol City (FL D3S)
