= 1936–37 Newport County A.F.C. season =

Welsh association football club season

Newport County
1936–37 season
- Manager: Louis Page
- Stadium: Somerton Park
- Third Division South: 19th
- FA Cup: 2nd round
- Third Division South Cup: 1st round
- Welsh Cup: Semi-final
- Top goalscorer: League: Chadwick (14); All: Derrick (19)
- Highest home attendance: 16,732 vs Cardiff City (12 September 1936)
- Lowest home attendance: 4,292 vs Aldershot (30 January 1937)
- Average home league attendance: 8,790
Home colours	Away colours

The 1936–37 season was Newport County's fifth consecutive season in the Third Division South and their 16th in the Football League.

== Season review ==
=== Results summary ===
Overall								Home						Away					
Pld	W	D	L	GF	GA	GAv	Pts	W	D	L	GF	GA	Pts	W	D	L	GF	GA	Pts
42	12	10	20	67	98	0.684	34	7	7	7	37	28	21	5	3	13	30	70	13

Source: rsssf.com

=== Results by round ===
Round	1	2	3	4	5	6	7	8	9	10	11	12	13	14	15	16	17	18	19	20	21	22	23	24	25	26	27	28	29	30	31	32	33	34	35	36	37	38	39	40	41	42
Ground	H	A	A	H	H	A	H	A	H	A	A	H	A	H	A	H	H	H	A	A	H	H	A	A	A	H	A	H	H	A	H	A	H	H	A	A	H	A	H	A	A	H
Result	L	L	L	L	L	D	D	L	D	L	L	W	D	L	L	D	D	W	L	L	L	W	W	L	D	W	W	L	D	L	W	L	D	W	W	L	W	W	L	L	W	D
Position	16	22	22	22	22	22	22	22	22	22	22	22	22	22	22	22	22	22	22	22	22	20	20	20	20	20	19	19	19	19	19	19	19	19	19	19	18	18	19	20	19	19

Updated to match(es) played on 1 May 1937. Source: statto.com
A = Away; H = Home; W = Win; D = Draw; L = Loss

== Fixtures and results ==
=== Third Division South ===
Date	Opponents	Venue	Result	Scorers	Attendance
29 Aug 1936	Watford	H	1–3	Hickman	10,267
2 Sep 1936	Brighton & Hove Albion	A	0–2		7,738
5 Sep 1936	Southend United	A	2–9	Lowry, Hickman	7,346
10 Sep 1936	Brighton & Hove Albion	H	1–4	Thomas	7,005
12 Sep 1936	Cardiff City	H	2–3	W.M.Owen 2	16,732
16 Sep 1936	Bristol Rovers	A	1–1	Crisp	10,524
19 Sep 1936	Gillingham	H	0–0		8,436
26 Sep 1936	Aldershot	A	0–2		3,947
3 Oct 1936	Swindon Town	H	1–1	Edwards	6,084
10 Oct 1936	Millwall	A	2–7	Hickman 2	21,333
17 Oct 1936	Crystal Palace	A	1–6	Chadwick	14,882
24 Oct 1936	Exeter City	H	2–0	Carr, Sullivan	10,428
31 Oct 1936	Reading	A	4–4	Chadwick 2, Lowry, Carr	4,880
7 Nov 1936	Queens Park Rangers	H	1–2	Chadwick	10,267
14 Nov 1936	Bristol City	A	1–3	Carr	14,467
21 Nov 1936	Torquay United	H	1–1	Derrick	8,650
5 Dec 1936	Clapton Orient	H	1–1	Chadwick	8,667
19 Dec 1936	Luton Town	H	2–1	Wood, Duggan	7,654
25 Dec 1936	Northampton Town	A	2–3	Chadwick, Duggan	12,371
26 Dec 1936	Watford	A	0–3		8,140
28 Dec 1936	Northampton Town	H	1–3	Wood	8,756
2 Jan 1937	Southend United	H	6–2	Chadwick 3, Wood 2, Duggan	4,754
9 Jan 1937	Cardiff City	A	1–0	Duggan	24,681
16 Jan 1937	Notts County	A	1–3	Sullivan	10,914
23 Jan 1937	Gillingham	A	4–4	Derrick 3, Kelso	6,125
30 Jan 1937	Aldershot	H	4–0	Derrick 2, Carr, Sullivan	4,292
6 Feb 1937	Swindon Town	A	2–1	Sullivan, Wood	7,872
13 Feb 1937	Millwall	H	1–2	Sullivan	9,369
20 Feb 1937	Crystal Palace	H	1–1	Carr	8,319
27 Feb 1937	Exeter City	A	1–3	Derrick	4,117
6 Mar 1937	Reading	H	3–0	Chadwick 3	8,449
13 Mar 1937	Queens Park Rangers	A	2–6	Duggan, Derrick	11,738
20 Mar 1937	Bristol City	H	0–0		8,749
26 Mar 1937	Bournemouth & Boscombe Athletic	H	4–0	Derrick 2, Duggan, Wood	10,007
27 Mar 1937	Torquay United	A	2–1	Chadwick 2	4,212
29 Mar 1937	Bournemouth & Boscombe Athletic	A	0–5		9,373
3 Apr 1937	Notts County	H	2–0	Wood, Derrick	12,324
10 Apr 1937	Clapton Orient	A	2–1	Thomas, Wood	6,054
17 Apr 1937	Walsall	H	1–2	Thomas	9,238
24 Apr 1937	Luton Town	A	0–5		14,469
26 Apr 1937	Walsall	A	2–1	Webb, Wood	2,760
1 May 1937	Bristol Rovers	H	2–2	Derrick, Sullivan	6,143

=== FA Cup ===
Round	Date	Opponents	Venue	Result	Scorers	Attendance
1	28 Nov 1936	Bristol City	H	3–0	Chadwick, Duggan, Sullivan	11,165
2	12 Dec 1936	Reading	A	2–7	Duggan 2	10,790

=== Third Division South Cup ===
Round	Date	Opponents	Venue	Result	Scorers	Attendance
1	1 Oct 1936	Watford	H	1–4		

=== Welsh Cup ===
Round	Date	Opponents	Venue	Result	Scorers	Attendance	Notes
6	22 Feb 1937	Porth	H	5–0	Derrick 3, Chadwick, Carr		
7	15 Mar 1937	Swansea Town	H	7–0	Derrick 4, Crisp, Chadwick, Wood		
SF	15 Apr 1937	Rhyl	N	2–3	Webb, Wood		At Gay Meadow

== League table ==
Pos	Team	Pld	W	D	L	F	A	GA	Pts
1	Luton Town	42	27	4	11	103	53	1.943	58
2	Notts County	42	23	10	9	74	52	1.423	56
3	Brighton & Hove Albion	42	24	5	13	74	43	1.721	53
4	Watford	42	19	11	12	85	60	1.417	49
5	Reading	42	19	11	12	76	60	1.267	49
6	Bournemouth & Boscombe Athletic	42	20	9	13	65	59	1.102	49
7	Northampton Town	42	20	6	16	85	68	1.250	46
8	Millwall	42	18	10	14	64	54	1.185	46
9	Queens Park Rangers	42	18	9	15	73	52	1.404	45
10	Southend United	42	17	11	14	78	67	1.164	45
11	Gillingham	42	18	8	16	52	66	0.788	44
12	Clapton Orient	42	14	15	13	52	52	1.000	43
13	Swindon Town	42	14	11	17	75	73	1.027	39
14	Crystal Palace	42	13	12	17	62	61	1.016	38
15	Bristol Rovers	42	16	4	22	71	80	0.887	36
16	Bristol City	42	15	6	21	58	70	0.829	36
17	Walsall	42	13	10	19	63	85	0.741	36
18	Cardiff City	42	14	7	21	54	87	0.621	35
19	Newport County	42	12	10	20	67	98	0.684	34
20	Torquay United	42	11	10	21	57	80	0.713	32
21	Exeter City	42	10	12	20	59	88	0.670	32
22	Aldershot	42	7	9	26	50	89	0.592	23

Key	
	Division Champions
	Re-elected
	Failed re-election
