= William Lunn =

William Lunn may refer to:

- William Lunn (politician) (1872–1942), English Labour Party politician
- William Lunn (educator) (1796–1886), Canadian educator, businessman, and politician
- William Lunn (rugby union) (1926–1996), New Zealand rugby union player
- William Lunn (freestyle skier) (fl. 2010s) in FIS Freestyle World Ski Championships 2011 – Men's ski cross
- William Lunn (priest) (died 1747), Archdeacon of Huntingdon and Wisbech

== See also ==
- Billy Lunn (disambiguation)
