= Jack Page (footballer, born 1886) =

English footballer

Personal information
- Full name: John Page
- Date of birth: 24 March 1886
- Place of birth: Liverpool, England
- Date of death: 1951 (aged 64–65)
- Height: 5 ft 10 in (1.78 m)
- Position: Defender

Senior career*
Years	Team	Apps	(Gls)
- Rochdale
1913–1920	Everton	9	(0)
1920–1926	Cardiff City	71	(0)
1926–1929	Merthyr Town	100	(1)
- * Club domestic league appearances and goals

John Page (24 March 1886 – 1951) was an English professional footballer who played as a defender. He made over 150 appearances in The Football League during spells with Everton, Cardiff City and Merthyr Town.

== Early life ==
Page was born in Liverpool, to Robert William Page and Jane Page (née Galvin). His father worked as a crane driver at the nearby docks. His parents had ten children, although five died. Three of his brothers Willie, Tom and Louis also went on to become professional footballers.

== Career ==
Page began his career with Rochdale before joining Everton in 1913. The outbreak of World War I interrupted his spell at the club, making nine appearances in The Football League during two full seasons with the club. In 1920, he signed for Cardiff City upon the club's election to the Second Division. Manager Fred Stewart had been impressed by Page's versatility, being able to play in any defensive position.

Although never a consistent first choice, he remained with Cardiff for six seasons as the club won promotion to the First Division and established itself in the top tier. He made 71 appearances in league competition for the club, regularly covering for Charlie Brittain, Jimmy Blair or Jimmy Nelson due to injury or international duty. He left Cardiff in 1926 to join Merthyr Town where he made 100 league appearances, scoring his first league goal, and captained the side.
