= Clive Green =

English professional footballer

Clive Gree
Personal information
- Full name: Clive Peter Green
- Date of birth: 6 December 1957 (age 68)
- Place of birth: Portsmouth, England
- Position: Forward

Senior career*
Years	Team	Apps	(Gls)
1976–1978	Portsmouth	40	(4)
1978–1982	Yeovil Town		
1982–1986	Maidstone United	86	(28)
1987–1989	Salisbury City		(6)
- * Club domestic league appearances and goals

Clive Peter Green (born 6 December 1959) is an English former professional footballer who played in the Football League as a forward for Portsmouth. He also played non-league football for clubs including Yeovil Town, Maidstone United, Croydon, Dover Athletic and Salisbury. He also played for England Under 18 Schoolboys.
