= Cecil Pemberton =

English footballer

Personal information
- Full name: Cecil Pemberton
- Position: Centre forward

Senior career*
Years	Team	Apps	(Gls)
	Horwich RMI	?	(?)
1930–1931	Burnley	0	(0)
1931–1932	Yeovil & Petters United	?	(?)
1932–1933	Millwall	6	(1)
- * Club domestic league appearances and goals

Cecil Pemberton was a professional footballer who played as a centre forward. He started his career at Horwich RMI before he was signed by Football League Second Division side Burnley in 1930. Pemberton stayed with Burnley for a season but he failed to make a first-team appearance and moved to Yeovil & Petters United in 1932. After a season with Yeovil, he transferred to Millwall, where he played six games and scored one goal in the Football League before retiring in 1933.
