= Warren Patmore =

English association footballer (born 1971)

Personal information
- Date of birth: 14 August 1971 (age 55)
- Place of birth: Kingsbury, England
- Position: Forward

Youth career
- Brentford

Senior career*
Years	Team	Apps	(Gls)
1991–1992	Northwood	16	(16)
1992–1993	Cambridge United	1	(0)
1992	→ Bashley (loan)	0	(0)
1993	Millwall	1	(0)
1993	→ Cobh Ramblers (loan)	8	(3)
1993–1995	Northampton Town	21	(2)
1994	→ Dundalk (loan)	9	(2)
1995	→ Ards (loan)	20	(2)
1995–2001	Yeovil Town	287	(140)
2001	Rushden & Diamonds	4	(1)
2001–2003	Woking	63	(25)
2003	Margate	6	(1)
2004	Northwood	1	(1)
2006–2009	Morchard Bishop	0	(0)
2009	Wellington	1	(0)
Total		376	(162)

Managerial career
- 2006–2009: Morchard Bishop (Player Manager)
- 2009–2010: Wellington (player/manager)
- 2010: Witheridge
- ????–2012: Crediton United
- 2017–????: Elmore
- * Club domestic league appearances and goals

Warren Patmore is an English former non-league footballer most notable for his career with Yeovil Town where he is considered one of the club's greatest ever players, scoring 140 goals in 287 games for the Glovers, making him the club's third top goal-scorer of all time.

== Playing career ==
Patmore played for many league clubs including Cambridge United, Millwall and Northampton Town. He then went to Northern Ireland to play for Ards before finding first team football at non-League club Yeovil Town.

In the summer of 2001 Patmore moved to Rushden & Diamonds, scoring on his debut for Rushden against York City.

Patmore also played for the England non-League representative team on a number of occasions before ending his career at Margate in 2003.

== Managerial career ==
Patmore was an instant success with Management gaining two promotions in three seasons with Devon & Exeter Football League side Morchard Bishop. Looking for a return to Somerset Patmore applied unsuccessfully for the vacant managerial job at Taunton Town. However he was successful with his application for the managerial position at Wellington in June 2009. In what was only Wellington's second season in the Premier Division he guided them to a tenth-place finish. On 9 May 2010, Patmore resigned as Wellington manager, citing distance to travel as the main reason behind his resignation. In June 2010 he was appointed as the new manager of South West Peninsula League side Witheridge, but left the club in November by mutual consent after issues with the chairman, and the club mid-table.

He later managed Crediton United but left the club after leading the club to their highest placed league finish in 21 years of 4th, due to "club lacking the ambition to move forward". He subsequently took charge of Tiverton Town's reserve team, but quit at the end of the 2016–17 season.

== Season by season ==
Year	Division	Club	Games	Goals	Strike rate
1991–1992	Spartan League	Northwood	16	16	1.00
1992–1993	Division Two	Cambridge United	1	0	0.00
1992–1993	Southern League	Bashley	??	12	0.00
1992–1993	Division Two	Millwall	1	0	0.00
1992–1993	Division One	Cobh Ramblers	8	3	0.00
1993–1994	Division Three	Northampton Town	21	2	0.09
1994–1995	Premiership	Dundalk	9	2	0.22
1994–1995	Premiership	Ards	20	2	0.10
1995–1996	Isthmian Prem	Yeovil Town	38	23	0.60
1996–1997	Conference	Yeovil Town	38	19	0.50
1997–1998	Conference	Yeovil Town	37	16	0.43
1998–1999	Conference	Yeovil Town	38	20	0.52
1999–2000	Conference	Yeovil Town	38	13	0.34
2000–2001	Conference	Yeovil Town	36	18	0.50
2001–2002	Division Three	Rushden & Diamonds	4	1	0.25
2001–2002	Conference	Woking	26	11	0.42
2002–2003	Conference	Woking	37	14	0.37
2003–2004	Conference	Margate	6	1	0.16
2004–2005	Isthmian Prem	Northwood	1	1	1.00
2006–2007	Devon 4	Morchard Bishop	0	0	0.00
2007–2008	Devon 3	Morchard Bishop	0	0	0.00
2008–2009	Devon 2	Morchard Bishop	0	0	0.00
Total			375	163	0.43

== Honours ==
=== Managerial ===
==== Morchard Bishop ====
- Devon & Exeter Senior Division 3 League winners 2006–07
- Devon & Exeter Senior Division 4 League runners up 2007–08 (Champions Beacon Knights)

==== Crediton Utd ====
- South West Peninsula Football League 4th-place finish 2011–12

==== Tiverton Town Reserves ====
- Devon & Exeter Senior Premier Runners up 2012–13
- Devon & Exeter Senior Premier League Winners 2013–14
- Throgmorton Champion's Cup Winners 2013–14
- Southwest Peninsula League East Winners 2015–16
