= Terry Cotton =

Footballer (born 1946)

Personal information
- Full name: Terence Cotton
- Date of birth: 25 January 1946 (age 80)
- Place of birth: Liverpool, England
- Positions: Centre half; forward

Senior career*
Years	Team	Apps	(Gls)
- Llanelli
–1968	Ammanford		
1968–1971	Swansea City	12	(1)
1971–1977	Yeovil Town		
1977–1978	Salisbury		(4)
1978–1980	Yeovil Town		
- Taunton Town
- Bridport

International career
1968–1969	Wales Amateurs	4	(0)
- * Club domestic league appearances and goals

Terence Cotton (born 25 January 1946) is a former amateur footballer who played as a centre half, notably in the Southern League with Yeovil Town, for whom he made 415 appearances. He also played in the Football League for Swansea City. Born in England, he was capped by Wales at amateur level. After retiring as a player, Cotton served Yeovil Town as youth team manager, assistant manager and in hospitality.

== Personal life ==
Upon joining Yeovil Town in 1971, Cotton worked for Normalair. His wife Jean worked as a secretary at Yeovil Town for more than 30 years, before retiring in 2020. As of 2003, Cotton was a skittles player.

== Honours ==
Swansea City

- Football League Fourth Division third-place promotion: 1969–70

Individual

- Yeovil Town Player of the Year: 1972–73, 1975–76
