= Dick Plumb =

English footballer

Personal information
- Full name: Richard Kevin Plumb
- Date of birth: 24 September 1946 (age 80)
- Place of birth: Swindon, England
- Height: 5 ft 10 1/2 in (1.79 m)
- Position: Forward

Youth career
- Swindon Town

Senior career*
Years	Team	Apps	(Gls)
1963–1965	Swindon Town	0	(0)
1965–1968	Bristol Rovers	39	(8)
1968–1970	Yeovil Town		
1970–1972	Charlton Athletic	43	(10)
1972–1974	Exeter City	59	(17)
1974–1978	Yeovil Town		
1978–?	Chard Town		
- * Club domestic league appearances and goals

Richard Kevin Plumb (born 24 September 1946) is a former professional footballer, who played as a forward in The Football League for three different teams.

Plumb started out as an apprentice with his home town team, Swindon Town, but although he spent 16 months as a professional with them he never made it into the first team. His League debut came after moving to Bristol Rovers in April 1965, when he played against Brighton & Hove Albion in October of that year. He went on to make 39 League appearances for The Pirates, scoring eight goals, before non-League side Yeovil Town broke their transfer record to sign him for £3,000 in October 1968.

His first of two spells with the Somerset club saw him score 53 goals in 111 appearances in all competitions, and when Charlton Athletic came in to sign him in September 1970 he also became Yeovil's record sale, at £7,000. He made 43 League appearances and scored ten goals for Charlton, before moving on to Exeter City in 1972, where he played a further 59 times in The Football League and scored 17 goals. In 1974, he returned to Yeovil Town, and in this spell he played a grand total of 226 games and scored 97 goals. His combined total of 150 goals for The Glovers made him their second highest scoring post-war player, as of March 2010. He ended his footballing career with Chard Town, who he joined in the summer of 1978.
