= Willie Page =

English footballer

Personal information
- Full name: William Page
- Date of birth: 17 September 1896
- Place of birth: Kirkdale, Liverpool, England
- Date of death: 1981 (aged 84–85)
- Position: Inside forward

Senior career*
Years	Team	Apps	(Gls)
1914–1919	South Liverpool		
1919–1920	Rochdale		
1920–1921	Port Vale	0	(0)
1921–1922	Cardiff City	0	(0)
1922–1927	Northampton Town	13	(1)
1927–19??	Costains		
Total		13+	(1+)
- * Club domestic league appearances and goals

William Page (17 September 1896 – 1981) was an English professional footballer who played as an inside forward. Three of his brothers, Jack, Louis and Tom, were also professional footballers.

== Career statistics ==
Appearances and goals by club, season and competition
Club	Season	League			FA Cup		Total	
Club	Season	Division	Apps	Goals	Apps	Goals	Apps	Goals
Port Vale	1920–21	Second Division	0	0	0	0	0	0
Cardiff City	1921–22	First Division	0	0	0	0	0	0
Northampton Town	1922–23	Third Division South	13	1	0	0	13	1
