= 1937–38 Newport County A.F.C. season =

Welsh association football club season

Newport County
1937–38 season
- Manager: Louis Page (until 9 September); Billy McCandless (from 9 September)
- Stadium: Somerton Park
- Third Division South: 16th
- FA Cup: Third round
- Third Division South Cup: First round
- Welsh Cup: Semi-final
- Top goalscorer: League: J. Hickman/T. Wood (9); All: J. Hickman/T. Wood (12)
- Highest home attendance: 24,268 vs Cardiff City (16 October 1937)
- Lowest home attendance: 3,671 vs Bristol Rovers (5 May 1938)
- Average home league attendance: 9,248
Home colours	Away colours

The 1937–38 season was Newport County's 16th season in the Third Division South and 17th overall in the Football League. They had been ever-present in the third tier except for the 1931–32 season since the introduction of the Football League Third Division in 1920.

The match with Cardiff City on 16 October 1937 recorded the highest-ever attendance at Somerton Park.

== Season review ==
=== Results summary ===
Overall								Home						Away					
Pld	W	D	L	GF	GA	GAv	Pts	W	D	L	GF	GA	Pts	W	D	L	GF	GA	Pts
42	11	16	15	43	52	0.827	38	9	10	2	31	15	28	2	6	13	12	37	10

Source: rsssf.com

=== Results by round ===
Round	1	2	3	4	5	6	7	8	9	10	11	12	13	14	15	16	17	18	19	20	21	22	23	24	25	26	27	28	29	30	31	32	33	34	35	36	37	38	39	40	41	42
Ground	H	A	A	H	H	A	A	H	A	H	H	A	H	A	H	A	A	A	A	H	A	H	H	A	H	A	H	A	A	H	A	H	A	H	A	A	H	H	A	H	H	H
Result	D	L	L	W	W	L	L	D	L	W	D	D	W	D	W	W	D	L	L	D	L	L	W	L	W	L	D	D	L	D	L	D	W	W	D	D	W	D	L	D	D	L
Position	9	15	19	12	10	12	16	17	17	15	17	18	13	11	10	10	9	13	14	14	15	17	15	16	15	16	16	16	16	16	16	16	16	16	16	16	15	15	15	16	16	16

Updated to match(es) played on 2 May 1938. Source: statto.com
A = Away; H = Home; W = Win; D = Draw; L = Loss

== Fixtures and results ==
=== Third Division South ===
Date	Opponents	Venue	Result	Scorers	Attendance
28 Aug 1937	Exeter City	H	2–2	Wood, Hickman	13,597
1 Sep 1937	Gillingham	A	0–1		6,295
4 Sep 1937	Swindon Town	A	2–3	Derrick, Wood	10,958
9 Sep 1937	Gillingham	H	2–0	H.Webb, Sullivan	5,662
11 Sep 1937	Aldershot	H	4–0	Derrick 2, Duggan, H.Webb	10,546
13 Sep 1937	Walsall	A	1–3	Duggan	3,621
18 Sep 1937	Millwall	A	0–4		23,061
25 Sep 1937	Reading	H	2–2	Derrick, Wood	11,510
2 Oct 1937	Crystal Palace	A	0–3		15,362
9 Oct 1937	Notts County	H	3–0	Wood 2, Derrick	11,574
16 Oct 1937	Cardiff City	H	1–1	Derrick	24,268
23 Oct 1937	Bournemouth & Boscombe Athletic	A	1–1	Hickman	4,741
30 Oct 1937	Brighton & Hove Albion	H	1–0	Derrick	7,999
6 Nov 1937	Queens Park Rangers	A	0–0		11,558
13 Nov 1937	Southend United	H	2–0	Hickman 2	9,295
20 Nov 1937	Clapton Orient	A	2–0	Duggan, Hickman	6,702
4 Dec 1937	Mansfield Town	A	1–1	W.M.Owen	2,946
18 Dec 1937	Northampton Town	A	0–2		4,989
25 Dec 1937	Watford	A	0–3		7,473
27 Dec 1937	Watford	H	0–0		13,820
1 Jan 1938	Exeter City	A	0–2		5,655
13 Jan 1938	Torquay United	H	0–2		3,713
15 Jan 1938	Swindon Town	H	2–0	Wood 2	4,340
22 Jan 1938	Aldershot	A	0–5		4,032
29 Jan 1938	Millwall	H	3–1	Hickman, Derrick, W.E.Owen	7,406
3 Feb 1938	Reading	A	1–2	Chadwick	9,136
12 Feb 1938	Crystal Palace	H	0–0		7,933
19 Feb 1938	Notts County	A	1–1	Chadwick	12,843
26 Feb 1938	Cardiff City	A	1–3	Wood	25,608
5 Mar 1938	Bournemouth & Boscombe Athletic	H	1–1	Hickman	8,285
12 Mar 1938	Brighton & Hove Albion	A	0–1		9,345
19 Mar 1938	Queens Park Rangers	H	1–1	James (OG)	10,225
26 Mar 1938	Southend United	A	2–0	Chadwick 2	5,570
2 Apr 1938	Clapton Orient	H	3–1	Wood, W.E.Owen, Chadwick	7,085
9 Apr 1938	Torquay United	A	0–0		3,994
15 Apr 1938	Bristol City	A	0–0		26,907
16 Apr 1938	Mansfield Town	H	1–0	Hickman	8,087
18 Apr 1938	Bristol City	H	0–0		17,008
23 Apr 1938	Bristol Rovers	A	0–2		6,492
30 Apr 1938	Northampton Town	H	0–0		4,436
5 May 1938	Bristol Rovers	H	2–2	W.M.Owen, Sullivan	3,671
7 May 1938	Walsall	H	1–2	Hickman	3,766

=== FA Cup ===
Round	Date	Opponents	Venue	Result	Scorers	Attendance
1	27 Nov 1937	Kidderminster Harriers	Aggborough	2–2	H.Webb, Derrick	6,353
1r	3 Dec 1937	Kidderminster Harriers	Somerton Park	4–1	H.Webb, Derrick	7,300
2	11 Dec 1937	Bournemouth & Boscombe Athletic	Somerton Park	2–1	Duggan, Derrick	10,500
3	8 Jan 1938	Bradford Park Avenue	Park Avenue	4–7	Duggan, Hickman, W.M.Owen, Derrick	11,000

=== Division Three South Cup ===
Round	Date	Opponents	Venue	Result	Scorers	Attendance
1	21 Oct 1937	Watford	Somerton Park	2–2	Woods 2	1,000
1r	27 Oct 1937	Watford	Vicarage Road	0–4		

=== Welsh Cup ===
Round	Date	Opponents	Venue	Result	Scorers	Attendance
6	10 Feb 1938	Bristol City	Somerton Park	6–2	Hickman 2, W.E.Owen 2, Wood, Chadwick	1,095
7	10 Mar 1938	Cheltenham Town	Somerton Park	1–0	Duggan	
SF	26 Apr 1938	Shrewsbury Town	Gay Meadow	2–3	W.M.Owen 2	8,000

== League table ==
Pos	Team	Pld	W	D	L	F	A	GA	GD	Pts
1	Millwall	42	23	10	9	83	37	2.243	+46	56
2	Bristol City	42	21	13	8	68	40	1.700	+28	55
3	Queens Park Rangers	42	22	9	11	80	47	1.702	+33	53
4	Watford	42	21	11	10	73	43	1.698	+30	53
5	Brighton & Hove Albion	42	21	9	12	64	44	1.455	+20	51
6	Reading	42	20	11	11	71	63	1.127	+8	51
7	Crystal Palace	42	18	12	12	67	47	1.426	+20	48
8	Swindon Town	42	17	10	15	49	49	1.000	±0	44
9	Northampton Town	42	17	9	16	51	57	0.895	–6	43
10	Cardiff City	42	15	12	15	67	54	1.241	+13	42
11	Notts County	42	16	9	17	50	50	1.000	±0	41
12	Southend United	42	15	10	17	70	68	1.029	+2	40
13	Bournemouth & Boscombe Athletic	42	14	12	16	56	57	0.982	–1	40
14	Mansfield Town	42	15	9	18	62	67	0.925	–5	39
15	Bristol Rovers	42	13	13	16	46	61	0.754	–15	39
16	Newport County	42	11	16	15	43	52	0.827	–9	38
17	Exeter City	42	13	12	17	57	70	0.814	–13	38
18	Aldershot	42	15	5	22	39	59	0.661	–40	35
19	Clapton Orient	42	13	7	22	42	61	0.689	–19	33
20	Torquay United	42	9	12	21	38	73	0.521	–35	30
21	Walsall	42	11	7	24	52	88	0.591	–36	29
22	Gillingham	42	10	6	26	36	77	0.468	–41	26

Pld = Matches played; W = Matches won; D = Matches drawn; L = Matches lost; F = Goals for; A = Goals against;
GA = Goal average; GD = Goal difference; Pts = Points

Key	
	Division Champions, promoted
	Re-elected
	Failed re-election
