= 1929–30 Western Football League =

33rd Season in the history of Western Football League

Western Football League
- Season: 1929–30
- Champions: Yeovil and Petters United (Division One); Trowbridge Town (Division Two)

The 1929–30 season was the 33rd in the history of the Western Football League.

The Division One champions for the third time were Yeovil and Petters United, after finishing bottom of the table the previous season. The previous season's champions, Bristol Rovers Reserves, finished bottom this year. The winners of Division Two were Trowbridge Town for the second time in three years. There was again no promotion or relegation between the two divisions this season.

== Division One ==
The composition of the eight-club Division One remained the same as for the previous season, with no clubs joining or leaving.

Pos	Team	Pld	W	D	L	GF	GA	GR	Pts	Result
1	Yeovil and Petters United	14	10	2	2	32	13	2.462	22	
2	Exeter City Reserves	14	5	5	4	26	17	1.529	15	
3	Bristol City Reserves	14	5	5	4	28	27	1.037	15	
4	Plymouth Argyle Reserves	14	6	2	6	23	20	1.150	14	
5	Taunton Town	14	6	2	6	17	30	0.567	14	
6	Bath City Reserves	14	4	5	5	35	33	1.061	13	Left at the end of the season
7	Torquay United Reserves	14	4	3	7	27	32	0.844	11	
8	Bristol Rovers Reserves	14	3	2	9	18	34	0.529	8	

== Division Two ==
Division Two was increased from nine to ten clubs after Salisbury City and Yeovil and Petters United Reserves left the league, and three new clubs joined:

- Bristol City "A"
- Paulton Rovers, rejoining after leaving the league in 1926.
- Wells City, rejoining after leaving the league following the inaugural season in 1893.

Pos	Team	Pld	W	D	L	GF	GA	GR	Pts
1	Trowbridge Town	18	12	2	4	50	28	1.786	26
2	Portland United	18	11	3	4	50	27	1.852	25
3	Wells City	18	10	3	5	52	31	1.677	23
4	Bristol City "A"	18	9	3	6	54	41	1.317	21
5	Welton Rovers	18	9	3	6	50	48	1.042	21
6	Bath City Reserves	18	6	6	6	43	39	1.103	18
7	Paulton Rovers	18	4	5	9	26	50	0.520	13
8	Bristol St George	18	5	1	12	41	51	0.804	11
9	Radstock Town	18	5	1	12	32	57	0.561	11
10	Weymouth	18	4	3	11	26	52	0.500	11

Rules for classification: The system of using goal average to separate two teams tied on points was used up to and including the 1976–77 season. The points system: 2 points for a win, 1 point for a draw and 0 points for losing.
