= Billy Lunn (footballer) =

Footballer from Northern Ireland

Personal information
- Full name: William John Lunn
- Date of birth: 8 May 1923
- Place of birth: Lurgan, Northern Ireland
- Date of death: 19 January 2000 (aged 76)
- Place of death: Bournemouth, England
- Position: Forward

Senior career*
Years	Team	Apps	(Gls)
- Glenavon
1946–1947	West Bromwich Albion	10	(5)
1947–1950	Bournemouth & Boscombe Athletic	47	(19)
1950–1952	Newport County	6	(1)
- Yeovil Town
Total		63	(25)
- * Club domestic league appearances and goals

William John Lunn (8 May 1923 – 19 January 2000) was a footballer from Northern Ireland who played in the Football League for West Bromwich Albion, Bournemouth & Boscombe Athletic and Newport County.
