= Johnny Hayward =

English footballer (1887–1958)

Personal information
- Date of birth: 1887
- Place of birth: Yeovil, Somerset, England
- Date of death: 22 October 1958 (aged 70–71)
- Place of death: Yeovil, Somerset, England
- Position: Forward

Youth career
- Boys Brigade Baptist
- –1906: Yeovil YMCA

Senior career*
Years	Team	Apps	(Gls)
1907–1927	Yeovil Town	288+	(548+)
Total		288+	(548+)

International career
	Somerset	22	(27+)
- * Club domestic league appearances and goals

Fred "Johnny" Hayward (1887 – 22 October 1958) was an English footballer who played as a forward.

== Early life ==
Fred "Johnny" Hayward was the youngest of the seven children of glove cutter William Henry Hayward and his glove machinist wife Mary Ann née Tutchings. William and Mary's children, all born in Yeovil, were; Bessie, Alice, Rose, Lilly, Charles, Louie and Fred. 14-year-old Johnny was working as a solicitor's clerk. His career in law was short lived and most of his working life was spent as a glove cutter like his father. This would continue at times throughout his playing career. He started his football career, playing in his local football league, for Boys Brigade Baptist FC. Despite this, reports say that Hayward's early sporting achievements came in cricket.

== Club career ==
Hayward made his debut in April 1907, starting in a 2–1 loss against Warminster Town and scoring Yeovil Casuals' only goal.

=== 1907–1908 ===
Hayward was brought straight into Yeovil's first team, in their first match of the season a friendly against Upton Park from London. Although he didn't score in the 4–3 defeat, Hayward would go on to score 21 goals in his next 26 games. Within three months, Hayward had earned his first call up as a reserve for the Somerset County team to play Devon at Pen Mill in mid-January 1908. He earned his first Somerset cap a month later against Hampshire at Moordown. In a 5–2 defeat, Hayward, was praised for his performance, marking it with a goal. By the end of the season Hayward had scored 41 goals.

=== 1908–1909 ===
Hayward scored 18 goals by the end of December in just 15 games. At Home Park, Plymouth, in November 1908, he also scored both goals in a famous victory for Somerset over a very strong Devon County-side. He would then score 5 goals in a 9–1 victory over traditional rivals Weymouth in January 1909. The 1908–09 season ended up with Yeovil claiming the Dorset championship, after a 3–0 win over Branksome Gasworks at Dorchester. Hayward scored 33 goals this season.

=== 1909–1910 ===
Although scoring regularly, his goal tallies were not matching that of his previous two seasons. In the FA Cup, the Glovers had reached the last qualifying round of the before the first round proper, the furthest they had achieved so far. Yeovil would go on to lose 6-1. Later in the season, the Exeter City press announced that Hayward had signed Southern League forms at St James Park and was making his debut for The Grecians a couple of days later against St Luke's College. This season Fred scored 22 goals.

=== 1910–1911 ===
Fred had his third best scoring season to date as he scored 31 goals in 32 games.

=== 1911–1912 ===
Fred had one of poorer seasons, despite picking up 23 goals in 21 games.

=== 1912–1913 ===
At the start of the 1912–13 season, Fred brought more trophies to the club with the Somerset Senior League and Charity Cup captured. Somerset, in reaching the Southern Counties final for the first time in its history, were made it to the a final against Middlesex at Pen Mill, Yeovil. Hayward scored two in a 4–1 win. Fred would score 36 goals in 26 games.

=== 1913–1914 ===
During 1914, the two senior teams in the town, Yeovil Town and Petters United had come to the conclusion that an amalgamation would be the best move forward to widen the appeal of football in the town. At the end of the season, Johnny played, and as far as it is known, his one and only match for another club, Petters United, at Brickyard Lane in a Wiltshire League match against Melksham Town. He scored four of the goals in a 14–0 win. On 7 March 1914, Yeovil Town played Bournemouth Wanderers in the Dorset and District League and beat them 3–1, with Johnny scoring 2 of the goals.

=== 1919–1920 ===
When Hayward eventually returned to football, after the war, he was approaching thirty-two years of age. He also found himself technically in a higher standard of football as Yeovil had entered, for the first time, into the Western League Division Two. Hayward scored 4 goals in 5 matches and in one match against the Royal Tank Corp, scoring 6 goals in a 9-0 victory. A year later, Yeovil applied to and were accepted in the higher Western League One. He finished the season averaging over a goal a game, scoring 52 goals in 33 games.

=== 1920–1921 ===
The 1920–1921 season was a strong season for Hayward, scoring a hat trick against Bristol City Reserves at the last game of the season and in total, 43 goals in 35 games.

=== 1921–1922 ===
Fred's 1921–1922 campaign resulted in him scoring 60 goals, a career record.

=== 1922–1923 ===
Another step up in football was made in the 1922–23 season when the club entered the Southern League, again resulting in matches even further away from home. Additionally, the club had now become a professional outfit, under their first player manager Jack Gregory. Fred, now 35, scored 6 goals in a 12–1 FA Cup victory over Westbury United. In total Fred scored 30 goals.

=== 1923–1924 ===
Yeovil claimed the Southern League Western section, at the time the highest achievement in the club's history, assisted with his 38 goals.

=== 1924–1925 ===
This season was Fred's last season as Yeovil Town's top scorer, scoring 29 goals.

=== 1926–1927 ===
At 39 years old, Fred scored two hat tricks in a week in September against Exeter City in the Southern League and Street in a 10–1 FA Cup win. The chances for the first team became less, and by March Fred found himself mostly in the reserves. In his last career match against Lovells Athletic on 7 May 1927, Hayward scored seven goals in a 12–1 victory.

== Honours ==
- Southern League Western Division: 1923–24
- Bristol Charity League: 1921–22
- Dorset District League:1908–09
- Somerset Senior League: 1912–13, 1920–21
- Forse Somerset Charity Cup: 1910–11, 1912–13
