= 1935–36 Newport County A.F.C. season =

Welsh association football club season

Newport County
1935–36 season
- Manager: Louis Page
- Stadium: Somerton Park
- Third Division South: 21st (re-elected)
- FA Cup: 1st round
- Third Division South Cup: 1st round
- Welsh Cup: 6th round
- Top goalscorer: League: Derrick (15); All: Derrick (15)
- Highest home attendance: 15,858 vs Cardiff City (14 September 1935)
- Lowest home attendance: 2,515 vs Gillingham (19 March 1936)
- Average home league attendance: 5,892
Home colours	Away colours

The 1935–36 season was Newport County's fourth consecutive season in the Third Division South and their 15th in the Football League. County finished in the re-election places for the second consecutive season, but as with the previous season, were comfortably re-elected.

== Season review ==
=== Results summary ===
Overall								Home						Away					
Pld	W	D	L	GF	GA	GAv	Pts	W	D	L	GF	GA	Pts	W	D	L	GF	GA	Pts
42	11	9	22	60	111	0.541	31	8	4	9	36	44	20	3	5	13	24	67	11

Source: rsssf.com

=== Results by round ===
Round	1	2	3	4	5	6	7	8	9	10	11	12	13	14	15	16	17	18	19	20	21	22	23	24	25	26	27	28	29	30	31	32	33	34	35	36	37	38	39	40	41	42
Ground	H	A	A	H	H	A	H	A	H	A	A	H	A	H	A	H	H	A	H	A	A	H	A	A	A	H	A	H	H	A	H	A	H	H	A	H	A	A	H	H	A	H
Result	D	W	L	W	D	D	W	L	L	W	L	D	L	L	L	L	W	L	L	L	D	W	L	W	D	L	D	L	L	L	L	L	W	W	L	W	D	L	D	L	L	W
Position	12	3	15	4	10	4	6	10	15	7	14	13	17	17	20	19	20	20	21	21	21	22	22	21	21	22	21	22	22	22	22	22	21	21	21	21	21	21	21	21	21	21

Updated to match(es) played on 2 May 1936. Source: statto.com
A = Away; H = Home; W = Win; D = Draw; L = Loss

== Fixtures and results ==
=== Third Division South ===
Date	Opponents	Venue	Result	Scorers	Attendance
31 Aug 1935	Swindon Town	H	2–2	Green, Smith	11,408
4 Sep 1935	Bristol City	A	2–1	Green, McKay	14,933
7 Sep 1935	Coventry City	A	1–7	Thomas	17,138
9 Sep 1935	Bristol City	H	2–0	McKay, White	7,885
14 Sep 1935	Cardiff City	H	0–0		15,858
16 Sep 1935	Millwall	A	2–2	Smith 2	3,751
21 Sep 1935	Exeter City	H	2–1	Smith, Thomas	8,232
28 Sep 1935	Brighton & Hove Albion	A	1–7	Green	7,246
5 Oct 1935	Queens Park Rangers	H	3–4	Burgess 2, Parle	6,033
12 Oct 1935	Watford	A	5–2	Smith 3, Parle 2	8,110
19 Oct 1935	Gillingham	A	0–3		5,025
26 Oct 1935	Bournemouth & Boscombe Athletic	H	0–0		6,320
2 Nov 1935	Luton Town	A	0–7		10,085
9 Nov 1935	Reading	H	1–5	McKay	6,471
16 Nov 1935	Bristol Rovers	A	0–3		7,698
23 Nov 1935	Clapton Orient	H	2–3	Thomas, Derrick	4,724
7 Dec 1935	Northampton Town	H	5–1	Derrick 3, Burgess 2	3,780
18 Dec 1935	Crystal Palace	A	0–6		2,165
25 Dec 1935	Torquay United	H	1–6	Burgess	5,459
26 Dec 1935	Torquay United	A	2–3	Parle 2	5,233
28 Dec 1935	Swindon Town	A	1–1	D.Jones	5,629
4 Jan 1936	Coventry City	H	2–1	Derrick, Parle	5,166
18 Jan 1936	Cardiff City	A	0–2		10,981
22 Jan 1936	Southend United	A	2–1	Smith, Appleby	3,328
25 Jan 1936	Exeter City	A	3–3	Derrick 2, Appleby	3,688
1 Feb 1936	Brighton & Hove Albion	H	0–2		4,751
8 Feb 1936	Queens Park Rangers	A	1–1	Derrick	10,419
15 Feb 1936	Watford	H	0–5		5,405
27 Feb 1936	Notts County	H	1–2	Thomas	2,818
29 Feb 1936	Reading	A	1–2	Appleby	5,607
7 Mar 1936	Crystal Palace	H	2–5	Thomas, Derrick	3,232
14 Mar 1936	Bournemouth & Boscombe Athletic	A	0–2		5,396
19 Mar 1936	Gillingham	H	4–2	Parle 2, Smith, Thomas	2,515
21 Mar 1936	Bristol Rovers	H	1–0	Smith	5,890
28 Mar 1936	Clapton Orient	A	0–4		7,449
4 Apr 1936	Southend United	H	3–1	Clarke 2, Thomas	3,445
10 Apr 1936	Aldershot	A	1–1	Derrick	6,239
11 Apr 1936	Northampton Town	A	0–3		5,219
13 Apr 1936	Aldershot	H	1–1	Derrick	5,368
18 Apr 1936	Luton Town	H	0–2		6,356
25 Apr 1936	Notts County	A	2–6	Derrick 2	2,180
2 May 1936	Millwall	H	4–1	Derrick 2, Appleby, Thomas	2,617

=== FA Cup ===
Round	Date	Opponents	Venue	Result	Scorers	Attendance
1	30 Nov 1935	Southend United	H	0–1		4,000

=== Third Division South Cup ===
Round	Date	Opponents	Venue	Result	Scorers	Attendance
1	2 Oct 1935	Southend United	A	0–3		4,000

=== Welsh Cup ===
Round	Date	Opponents	Venue	Result	Scorers	Attendance
6	6 Feb 1936	Swansea Town	A	0–1		1,500

== League table ==
Pos	Team	Pld	W	D	L	F	A	GA	Pts
1	Coventry City	42	24	9	9	102	45	2.267	57
2	Luton Town	42	22	12	8	81	45	1.800	56
3	Reading	42	26	2	14	87	62	1.403	54
4	Queens Park Rangers	42	22	9	11	84	53	1.585	53
5	Watford	42	20	9	13	80	54	1.481	49
6	Crystal Palace	42	22	5	15	96	74	1.297	49
7	Brighton & Hove Albion	42	18	8	16	70	63	1.111	44
8	Bournemouth & Boscombe Athletic	42	16	11	15	60	56	1.071	43
9	Notts County	42	15	12	15	60	57	1.053	42
10	Torquay United	42	16	9	17	62	62	1.000	41
11	Aldershot	42	14	12	16	53	61	0.869	40
12	Millwall	42	14	12	16	58	71	0.817	40
13	Bristol City	42	15	10	17	48	59	0.814	40
14	Clapton Orient	42	16	6	20	55	61	0.902	38
15	Northampton Town	42	15	8	19	62	90	0.689	38
16	Gillingham	42	14	9	19	66	77	0.857	37
17	Bristol Rovers	42	14	9	19	69	95	0.726	37
18	Southend United	42	13	10	19	61	62	0.984	36
19	Swindon Town	42	14	8	20	64	73	0.877	36
20	Cardiff City	42	13	10	19	60	73	0.822	36
21	Newport County	42	11	9	22	60	111	0.541	31
22	Exeter City	42	8	11	23	59	93	0.634	27

Key	
	Division Champions
	Re-elected
	Failed re-election

=== Election ===
Votes	Club	Fate
48	Exeter City	Re-elected to the Football League
40	Newport County	Re-elected to the Football League
9	Bath City	Not elected to the Football League
1	Dartford	Not elected to the Football League
1	Folkestone	Not elected to the Football League
