= Dave Taylor (footballer, born 1940) =

English footballer

Personal information
- Full name: David Taylor
- Date of birth: 17 September 1940
- Place of birth: Rochester, England
- Date of death: 12 March 2017 (aged 76)
- Place of death: Yeovil, England
- Position: Inside forward

Youth career
- Gillingham

Senior career*
Years	Team	Apps	(Gls)
1957–1959	Gillingham	21	(3)
1959–1960	Portsmouth	2	(0)
1960–1969	Yeovil Town		
1969–1971	Bath City		
1971–?	Cheltenham Town		
- * Club domestic league appearances and goals

David Taylor (17 September 1940 – 12 March 2017) was an English footballer who played as an inside forward.

Taylor started his career at Gillingham where he played 21 appearances in the Football League scoring 3 goals, before leaving for Portsmouth where he made a further two Football League appearances. At the end of the 1959–60 season, Taylor dropped into non-league football joining Southern Football League side Yeovil Town. In nine seasons with Yeovil, Taylor scored 284 goals in 436 matches setting a post-war club record as top scorer. Taylor left Yeovil in April 1969, signing for their local rivals Bath City scoring a further 46 goals in 149 appearances before his departure in November 1971 for Cheltenham Town.

Taylor died in March 2017 aged 76.
