= Tommy Lowes =

English footballer and manager

Personal information
- Date of birth: 1891
- Place of birth: Walker, Newcastle upon Tyne, England
- Date of death: 1993 (aged 101–102)
- Position: Inside forward

Senior career*
| Years | Team | Apps | (Gls) |
| 1910–1914 | Newcastle United | 16 | (4) |
- Coventry City
- Caerphilly
- Newport County
| 1926–1929 | Yeovil Town | | |

Managerial career
- 1928–1929: Yeovil Town
- 1932–1937: Barrow
- 1937–1944: Walsall
- * Club domestic league appearances and goals

Tommy Lowes (1891–1993) was an English football player and manager.

== Biography ==
Lowes, an inside forward, played sixteen First Division games, scoring four goals, for his hometown club Newcastle United, before the outbreak of World War I. He later turned out for Coventry City, Caerphilly, and Newport County.

He became a player-coach at non-league side Yeovil Town, taking charge for the 1928–29 season. He took charge at Barrow in 1932, and remained in the hotseat for more than 200 games at Holker Street, until he was appointed manager of Walsall on 30 April 1937. The club struggled near the foot of the Third Division South table in 1937–38, and had to apply for re-election. He signed Johnny Hancocks in October 1938, who would go on to be capped by England and be one of the finest post-World War II players at high-flying Wolverhampton Wanderers. However the "Saddlers" continued to struggle under Lowes' management, and had to apply for re-election again in 1938–39, having finished second-from-bottom. The Football League was abandoned due to the outbreak of war in 1939–40.

Having departed Fellows Park, Lowes scouted for Arsenal and Norwich City, discovering another talent in John Barnwell. He remained at Carrow Road right up until 1972, and died sometime in 1993.
