= Fred Chadwick =

English footballer

Personal information
- Full name: Frederick William Chadwick
- Date of birth: 8 September 1913
- Place of birth: Manchester, England
- Date of death: 18 September 1987 (aged 74)
- Place of death: Bristol, England
- Height: 5 ft 10 in (1.78 m)
- Position: Centre forward

Senior career*
Years	Team	Apps	(Gls)
- British Dyes
–1935	Manchester City	0	(0)
1935–1936	Wolverhampton Wanderers	0	(0)
1936–1938	Newport County	40	(19)
1938–1947	Ipswich Town	41	(18)
1947	West Ham United	0	(0)
1947–1948	Bristol Rovers	6	(1)
1948–1949	Street		
- * Club domestic league appearances and goals

Frederick William Chadwick (8 September 1913 – 18 September 1987) was an English professional footballer who played in the Football League for Newport County, Ipswich Town and Bristol Rovers as a centre forward.

== Personal life ==
Chadwick was married with five children. During the Second World War, he was held prisoner of war by the Japanese and worked on the Burma Railway.

== Career statistics ==
Appearances and goals by club, season and competition
Club	Season	League			FA Cup		Other		Total	
Club	Season	Division	Apps	Goals	Apps	Goals	Apps	Goals	Apps	Goals
Ipswich Town	1938–39	Third Division South	35	17	4	5	2 (Note: Appearances in Suffolk Senior Cup)	1	41	23
Ipswich Town	1946–47	Third Division South	6	1	0	0	0	0	6	1
Career total			41	18	4	5	2	1	47	24
