= 1933–34 Southern Football League =

The 1933–34 season was the 36th in the history of the Southern League. The league consisted of Eastern and Western Divisions. Norwich City reserves won the Eastern Division for the second successive season, whilst Plymouth Argyle reserves won the Western Division. Plymouth reserves were declared Southern League champions after winning a championship play-off replay 3–0 after a 2–2 draw in the first match.

Folkestone were the only Southern League to apply to join the Football League, but received no votes in the election.

== Eastern Division ==
Southern Football League Eastern Division
- Season: 1933–34
- Champions: Norwich City II
- Promoted: none
- Relegated: none
- Matches: 72
- Goals: 246 (3.42 per match)

A total of 9 teams contest the division, including 8 sides from previous season and two new teams.

Newly elected teams:

- Margate
- Clapton Orient II

Pos	Team	Pld	W	D	L	GF	GA	GR	Pts
1	Norwich City II	16	9	4	3	41	15	2.733	22
2	Margate	16	8	3	5	23	20	1.150	19
3	Millwall II	16	7	4	5	28	28	1.000	18
4	Clapton Orient II	16	8	1	7	33	34	0.971	17
5	Bournemouth & Boscombe Athletic II	16	6	3	7	28	30	0.933	15
6	Tunbridge Wells Rangers	16	6	2	8	25	36	0.694	14
7	Folkestone	16	5	3	8	26	26	1.000	13
8	Guildford City	16	5	3	8	27	33	0.818	13
9	Dartford	16	4	5	7	15	24	0.625	13

Rules for classification: The system of using goal average to separate two teams tied on points was used up until the 1976-77 season. The points system: 2 points for a win, 1 point for a draw and 0 points for losing.

== Western Division ==
Southern Football League Western Division
- Season: 1933–34
- Champions: Plymouth Argyle II (4th title)
- Promoted: none
- Relegated: Merthyr Town (resigned); Llanelly (resigned)
- Matches: 110
- Goals: 468 (4.25 per match)

There were no new clubs in the Western Division this season.

Pos	Team	Pld	W	D	L	GF	GA	GR	Pts	Result
1	Plymouth Argyle II	20	13	6	1	62	22	2.818	32	
2	Bristol Rovers II	20	14	3	3	56	27	2.074	31	
3	Bath City	20	11	3	6	43	25	1.720	25	
4	Torquay United II	20	9	4	7	54	36	1.500	22	
5	Yeovil & Petters United	20	10	1	9	35	39	0.897	21	
6	Exeter City II	20	8	3	9	54	47	1.149	19	
7	Merthyr Town	20	8	2	10	39	50	0.780	18	Left league at end of season
8	Llanelly	20	8	1	11	25	39	0.641	17	Left league at end of season
9	Barry	20	4	5	11	37	64	0.578	13	
10	Newport County II	20	4	3	13	36	54	0.667	11	
11	Taunton Town	20	5	1	14	27	65	0.415	11	

Rules for classification: The system of using goal average to separate two teams tied on points was used up until the 1976-77 season. The points system: 2 points for a win, 1 point for a draw and 0 points for losing.

== Football League election ==
Folkestone were the only Southern League club to apply for election to Division Three South of the Football League. However, they received no votes and the two League clubs were re-elected.

Club	League	Votes
Bournemouth & Boscombe Athletic	Football League	48
Cardiff City	Football League	48
Folkestone	Southern League	0
