= 1934–35 Southern Football League =

The 1934–35 season was the 37th in the history of the Southern League. The league consisted of Eastern and Western Divisions. Norwich City reserves won the Eastern Division for the third successive season, whilst Yeovil & Petters United won the Western Division. Norwich reserves were declared Southern League champions after winning a championship play-off replay 7–2 after a 2–2 draw in the first match.

Two Southern League clubs applied to join the Football League, but neither was successful.

== Eastern Division ==
Southern Football League Eastern Division
- Season: 1934–35
- Champions: Norwich City II (2nd title)
- Promoted: none
- Relegated: none
- Matches: 90
- Goals: 351 (3.9 per match)

A total of 10 teams contest the division, including 9 sides from previous season and one new team.

Newly elected team:

- Aldershot II - returned after one season of absence

Pos	Team	Pld	W	D	L	GF	GA	GR	Pts
1	Norwich City II	18	12	1	5	52	21	2.476	25
2	Dartford	18	8	6	4	36	22	1.636	22
3	Margate	18	7	6	5	38	30	1.267	20
4	Bournemouth & Boscombe Athletic II	18	8	3	7	34	26	1.308	19
5	Guildford City	18	7	5	6	41	34	1.206	19
6	Aldershot II	18	7	3	8	29	43	0.674	17
7	Folkestone	18	5	6	7	30	39	0.769	16
8	Tunbridge Wells Rangers	18	6	4	8	32	56	0.571	16
9	Clapton Orient II	18	5	4	9	33	35	0.943	14
10	Millwall II	18	3	6	9	26	45	0.578	12

Rules for classification: The system of using goal average to separate two teams tied on points was used until the 1976-77 season. The points system: 2 points for a win, 1 point for a draw and 0 points for losing.

== Western Division ==
Southern Football League Western Division
- Season: 1934–35
- Champions: Yeovil & Petters United
- Promoted: none
- Relegated: none
- Matches: 72
- Goals: 307 (4.26 per match)

There were no new clubs in the Western Division this season.

Pos	Team	Pld	W	D	L	GF	GA	GR	Pts	Result
1	Yeovil & Petters United	16	11	2	3	49	18	2.722	24	
2	Newport County II	16	8	5	3	45	29	1.552	21	
3	Plymouth Argyle II	16	7	5	4	40	24	1.667	19	
4	Exeter City II	16	7	2	7	38	32	1.188	16	
5	Bath City	16	6	4	6	35	32	1.094	16	
6	Bristol Rovers II	16	5	5	6	33	37	0.892	15	
7	Barry	16	6	3	7	30	40	0.750	15	
8	Torquay United II	16	5	3	8	24	29	0.828	13	
9	Taunton Town	16	1	3	12	13	66	0.197	5	Left league at end of season

Rules for classification: The system of using goal average to separate two teams tied on points was used until the 1976-77 season. The points system: 2 points for a win, 1 point for a draw and 0 points for losing.

== Football League election ==
Bath City and Folkestone were the only Southern League clubs to apply for election to Division Three South of the Football League. However, both League clubs were re-elected.

Club	League	Votes
Southend United	Football League	48
Newport County	Football League	43
Bath City	Southern League	6
Folkestone	Southern League	1
