= Yeovil Town F.C. =

Association football club in England

Yeovil Town
- Full name: Yeovil Town Football Club
- Nickname: The Glovers
- Founded: 27 August 1895; 131 years ago (as Yeovil Casuals)
- Ground: Huish Park
- Capacity: 9,565 (5,212 seated)
- Owner: Inflection Holdings
- Chairman: Prabhu Srinivasan
- Manager: Billy Rowley
- League: National League
- 2025–26: National League, 16th of 24
- Website: ytfc.net
Home colours	Away colours

Yeovil Town Football Club is a professional association football club based in the town of Yeovil in Somerset, England. The team competes in the National League, the fifth level of the English football league system, after winning the 2023–24 National League South title. The club's home ground is Huish Park, built in 1990 on the site of an old army camp. That stadium is named after their former home, Huish, known for its pitch, which had an 8 feet (2.4 m) sideline to sideline slope. The club's nickname "the Glovers" is a reference to the history of glove-making in the town of Yeovil, which became a centre of the industry during the 18th and 19th centuries.

Founded in 1895, the club initially joined the Somerset Senior League and competed in a multitude of leagues up until the outbreak of World War II. During this time they won titles in the Southern League, Western League, Bristol Charity League, Dorset District League and Somerset Senior League. They played in the Southern League after the war ended, winning the championship in 1954–55, 1963–64 and 1970–71, before becoming members of the Alliance Premier League from 1979 to 1985. They spent the next three years in the Isthmian League, and were promoted into the Conference after finishing as champions in 1987–88. Relegated in 1995, they were promoted again two years later after winning another Isthmian League title. Yeovil won the 2002 FA Trophy final and secured a place in the Football League after winning the Conference in 2002–03 under the stewardship of Gary Johnson. They then won the League Two title in 2004–05, before reaching the Championship with victory in the 2013 Football League One play-off final in Johnson's second spell as manager. However they suffered consecutive relegations, and were relegated once more following the 2018–19 season, ending their 16-season spell in the Football League.

Yeovil are one of the most successful non-league teams in the FA Cup, having defeated major Football League teams, most famously Sunderland in the fourth round in 1949, before going on to play in front of more than 81,000 spectators away at Manchester United in the next round. For some years, as the only Football League side in Somerset, they have had few local rivalries as the club climbed the divisions in the 2000s, though their most notable is the derby shared with Dorset side, Weymouth.

== History ==
=== Non-League football ===
Chart showing the progress of Yeovil Town FC in League and Non-League football from 1988 to present

Yeovil Football Club was founded in 1890, and shared its ground with the local rugby club for many years. Five years later, the current club was founded and named Yeovil Casuals and started playing home games at the Pen Mill Athletic Ground. In 1907 the name Yeovil Town was adopted, which on amalgamation with Petters United became Yeovil and Petters United. The name reverted to Yeovil Town before the 1946–47 season.

The club came to national attention as 'giant-killers' during the 1948–49 FA Cup, in which they defeated Sunderland 2–1 in the fourth round, in front of a record home attendance of 17,000. They were defeated 8–0 in the following round by Manchester United.

Between 1955 and 1973 they were champions of the Southern Football League three times, and runners-up twice. During this period, Yeovil Town applied for election to the Football League on a number of occasions, coming within a few votes of being elected in 1976. In 1979 the Glovers were founder members of the new national non-league division, the Alliance Premier League. In 1985, they were relegated to the Isthmian League. Yeovil won that championship in 1988 and returned to the Conference.

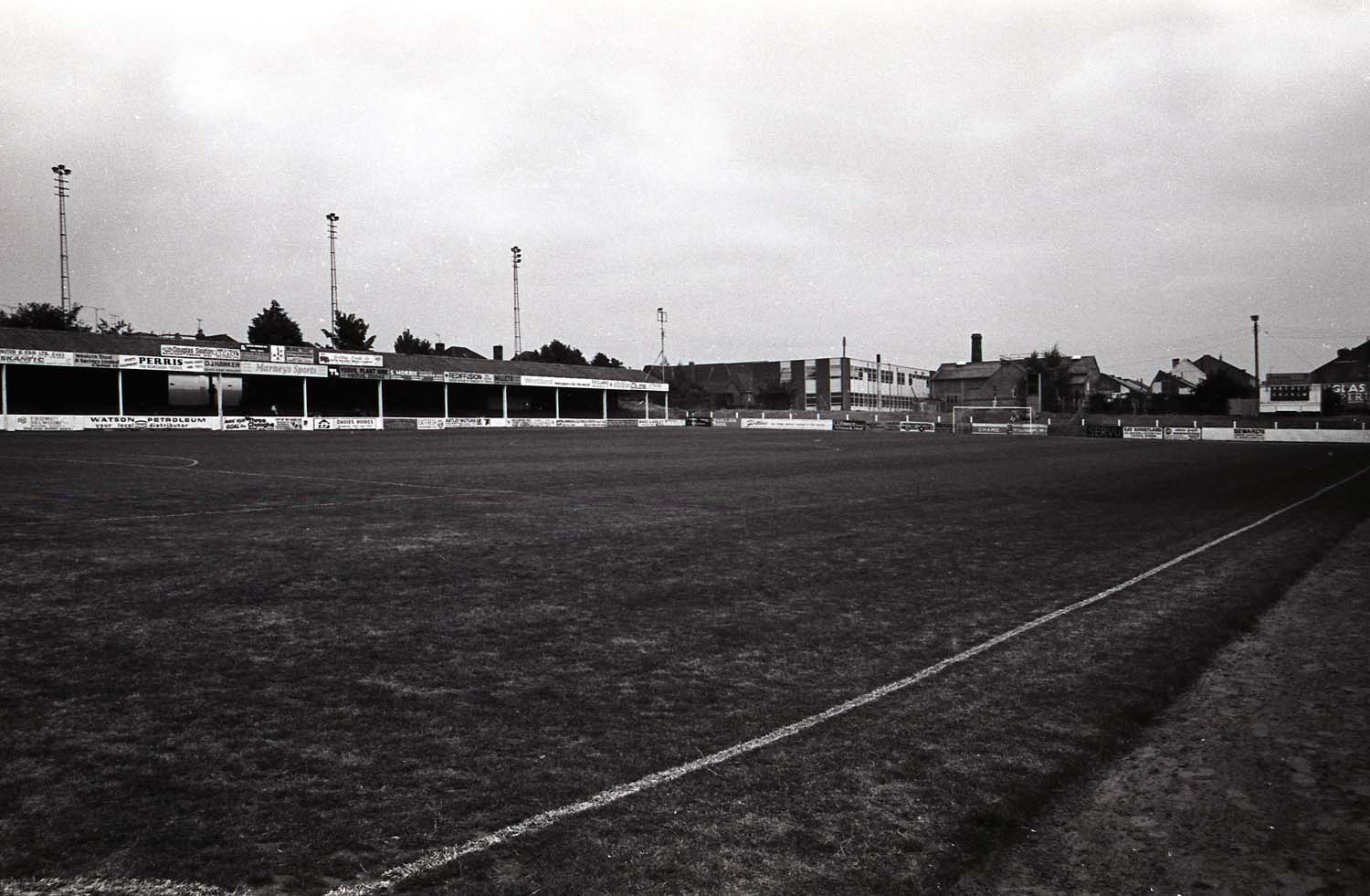
Yeovil's Huish ground in 1983.

There was success in the Bob Lord Challenge Trophy in 1990 and three years later Yeovil finished fourth in the Conference, their best finish ever. In January 1995, former Weymouth and Spurs player Graham Roberts was appointed manager, but demotion back to the Isthmian League soon followed. Yeovil secured promotion back into the Conference in 1997 after winning the Isthmian League with a record number of points – 101.

Colin Lippiatt became manager for the 1998–99 season and brought Terry Skiverton to the club as a player. Gary Johnson took over as manager in June 2001 and Yeovil won the FA Trophy in his first season in charge with a 2–0 victory over Stevenage Borough in the final at Villa Park – the club's first major trophy. Yeovil Town earned promotion to the Football League in the following season, by winning the Football Conference by a record 17 points margin, accumulating 95 points and scoring 100 goals, remaining unbeaten at Huish Park. Their team included many top players, some of whom went on to play Premier League football. Notable players include Gavin Williams who moved to West Ham United, Lee Johnson, Chris Weale, Darren Way and Adam Lockwood.

=== Reaching the Football League ===
Yeovil's first game in the Football League was a 3–1 away win over Rochdale. The Glovers finished their first season in eighth position, and reached the third round of the FA Cup before losing 2–0 at home to Liverpool. Before the game the club released a record sold only in shops in the town: "Yeovil True" reached No. 36 in the UK Singles Chart. The following season Yeovil finished as champions of League Two with 83 points, earning promotion to League One. During the season the club was sold by Jon Goddard-Watts to David Webb, who took over the role of chief executive from chairman John Fry.

At the beginning of the 2005–06 season manager Gary Johnson left Yeovil for Bristol City. He was replaced by his assistant Steve Thompson and Kevin Hodges was appointed as his number two. At the season's end Thompson was demoted to first-team coach and he was replaced by Russell Slade. Around this time John Fry had bought all Dave Webb's share of the club, becoming Yeovil Town's new owner. They again reached the fourth round of the FA Cup and were drawn away against Charlton Athletic, then in the Premier League, to whom they lost 3–2.

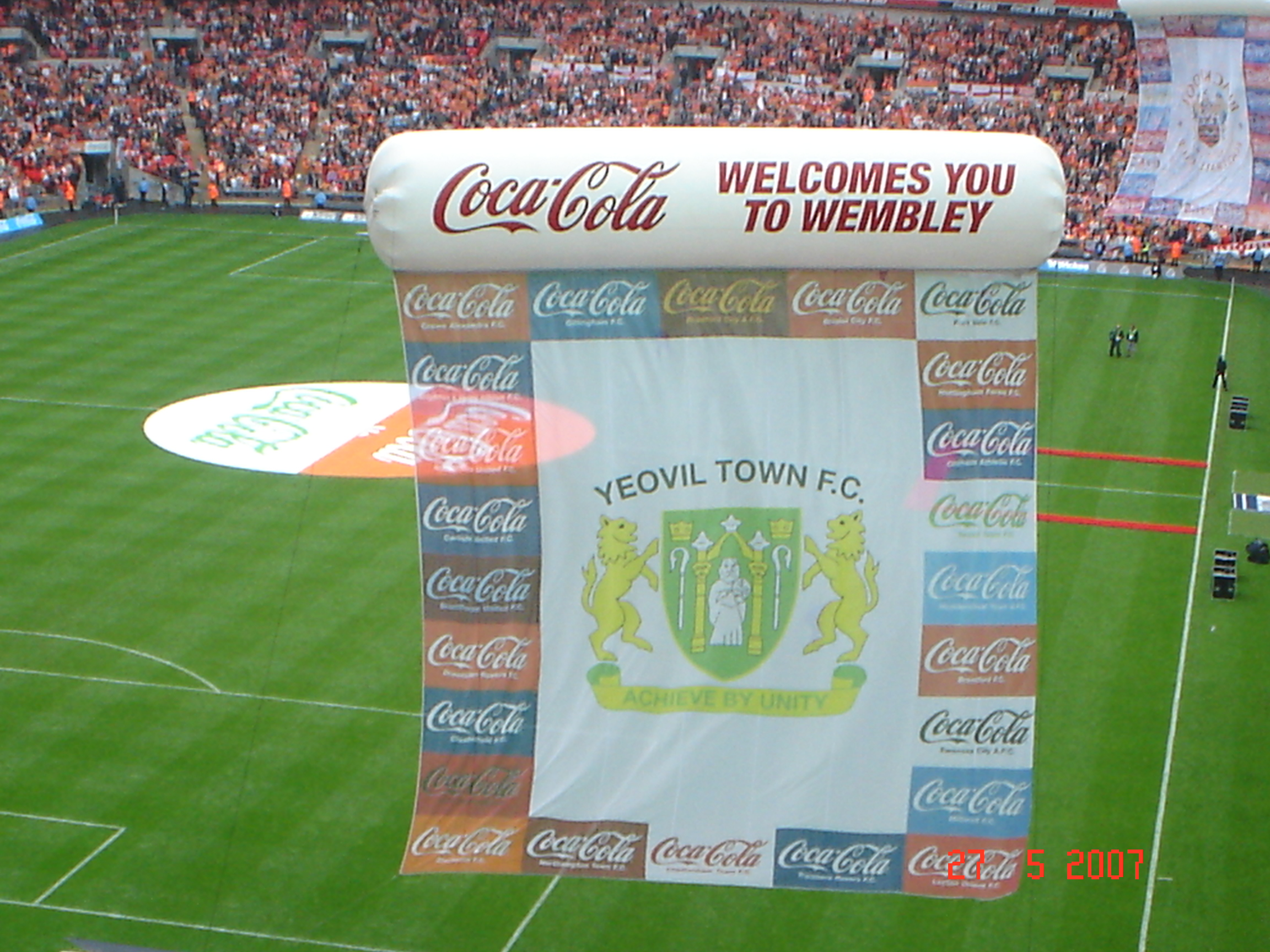
Yeovil flag at Wembley Stadium in 2007.

Yeovil finished the 2006–07 season in fifth position, qualifying for the League One play-offs. In the semi-final Yeovil beat Nottingham Forest in the two-legged match 5–4 on aggregate, after losing the first home leg 2–0. Yeovil met Blackpool at Wembley Stadium in the final, but were beaten 2–0.

The 2007–08 was less successful, as Yeovil finished 18th in League One with 52 points. Russell Slade continued as Yeovil manager into the 2008–09 season, but he left the position in February 2009. After one game with assistant manager Steve Thompson acting as caretaker manager, club captain Terry Skiverton was announced as manager until the end of the 2009–10 season, with Nathan Jones as his assistant. The duo kept Yeovil in League One, with safety secured following a 1–1 draw at Tranmere Rovers.

Skiverton and Jones helped Yeovil avoid relegation in the following two seasons, but a poor start the 2011–12 campaign prompted a change of manager. On 9 January 2012, the club announced the re-appointment of Gary Johnson, with Terry Skiverton becoming assistant. The Glovers went on to again achieve safety, finishing 11 points clear of the relegation zone.

Yeovil made their best ever start in the 2012–13 season, picking up 10 points from their first four games. Yeovil finished the 2012–13 season in fourth place, reaching the League One play-offs. They reached the final on 6 May 2013 after a 2–0 home victory against Sheffield United, overturning a 1–0 loss at Bramall Lane in the first leg. On 19 May 2013, Yeovil defeated Brentford 2–1 in the League One play-off final at Wembley, reaching the second tier for the first time in their history. Striker Paddy Madden, who netted the opening goal against Brentford at Wembley, finished as the league's top scorer.

Yeovil spent one season in the Championship and, despite enjoying memorable victories over Nottingham Forest, Sheffield Wednesday and Watford, suffered immediate relegation back to League One. The club's struggles continued the following season, although the club did earn a lucrative FA Cup tie against Manchester United, which they lost 2–0 despite a "gallant challenge". Manager Gary Johnson was eventually replaced by Paul Sturrock as Yeovil suffered another relegation, returning to League Two for the first time in 10 years.

Following a poor start to the 2015/16 season, Sturrock was sacked and replaced by Darren Way, initially in a caretaker role before being named permanent manager. Way was able to lead Yeovil to safety as they finished their campaign 19th in the table. During Way's tenure as manager, Yeovil equalled their record for heaviest Football League defeat with an 8–2 loss to Luton Town on the opening day of the 2017–18 season, although they also recorded their highest Football League victory under his leadership with a 6–0 win over Newport County in September 2018. The club also enjoyed another FA Cup tie with Manchester United in January 2018, however they lost 4–0 to José Mourinho's side.

=== Return to non-League football ===
Yeovil's 16-year stay in the EFL came to an end when they were relegated during the 2018–19 season, following a 2–2 draw with Northampton Town. Darren Sarll was unveiled as the club's new manager in June 2019 and a takeover of the club by a consortium led by Scott Priestnell and Errol Pope was announced in September 2019. On 22 April, the 2019–20 National League season was ended with immediate effect due to the coronavirus outbreak, with the Glovers fourth in the table. In May 2022, South Somerset District Council completed the purchase of Huish Park and its surrounding land for £2.8 million from Yeovil Town's owner Scott Priestnall, with the football club becoming tenants of the council through a leaseback arrangement.

In February 2023, it was announced that SU Glovers Limited, a company publicly fronted by Matt Uggla and former England rugby union international Paul Sackey, was in the process of completing a takeover of the majority shareholding of Yeovil Town Football and Athletic Club Limited. It was confirmed (ultimately prematurely) that former majority shareholder and chairman, Scott Priestnall, would no longer be involved with the football club. In April 2023, the club was relegated to the National League South. On 2 May 2023, it was reported that the SU Glovers takeover would not be proceeding; on 13 May 2023, Yeovil was taken over by a local company, the Hellier Group.

At the end of the 2023–24 season, Yeovil secured an immediate return to the National League after winning the National League South title.

On 29 May 2025, it was announced that entrepreneur Prabhu Srinivasan had completed the takeover of the club from former owner Martin Hellier after Srinivasan's family office, Inflection Holdings, acquired all shares previously held by the Hellier Trading Group, with Srinivasan becoming owner and chairman. Ahead of the 2025–26 season, the club confirmed that their first-team training operations would be relocating to the SGS WISE Campus in Stoke Gifford ahead of the new season.

=== Recent seasons ===
List of recent seasons, including league division and statistics, cup results, top scorer and average league attendance
Season	League									FA Cup	FA Trophy	Other		Top scorer		Average (Note: League matches only (excluding play-offs).) attendance
Season	Division (Note: Divisions are sorted according to their level within the English football league system at the time.)	P	W	D	L	F	A	Pts	Pos	FA Cup	FA Trophy	Competition	Result	Name	Goals	Average attendance
2021–22	National League	44	15	14	15	43	46	59	12th	R3	R4	Somerset Premier Cup	W	Tom Knowles	11	2,378
2022–23	National League ↓	46	7	19	20	35	60	40	22nd	QR4	R3	Somerset Premier Cup	QF	Alex Fisher; Malachi Linton; Matt Worthington	5	2,730
2023–24	National League South ↑	46	29	8	9	81	45	95	1st	R2	R2	Somerset Premier Cup	R2	Jordan Young	16	3,916
2024–25	National League	46	15	11	20	51	60	56	18th	QR4	R3	Somerset Premier Cup	R2	Aaron Jarvis	8	3,200
2025–26	National League	46	15	6	25	48	68	51	16th	QR4	QF	Somerset Premier Cup	R1	Luke McCormick	8	2,918

== Rivalries ==
Yeovil have their fiercest rivalry with Dorset club, Weymouth, which has been described as intense. Often when the two clubs meet, a large police presence is required to separate the two sets of fans. In October 2021, fans reportedly clashed before and after the game in Huish, with mounted police and dog units being called into action. The 2020–21 National League season marked the first league encounters between the club and Weymouth since the 1988–89 Football Conference season.

The club also shares a minor historic derby with fellow Somerset club, Bath City, with Yeovil playing them 274 times. Albeit since the turn of the century, the majority of any animosity dissipated heavily. Hereford United were also seen as rivals, before their dissolution in 2014, due to both clubs being fairly well matched during their time in non-league ranks. During the club's time in the EFL, Yeovil fans considered both Bristol Rovers and Bristol City to be rivals. In August 2009, Yeovil played Exeter City for the first time in the league, and both clubs have shared a rivalry since, with the match often being billed as a Westcountry Derby. Swindon Town and AFC Bournemouth were also considered somewhat rivals due to geographical proximity.

== Players ==
=== First-team squad ===
As of 22 November 2026

Note: Flags indicate national team as defined under FIFA eligibility rules; some limited exceptions apply. Players may hold more than one non-FIFA nationality.

No.	Pos.	Nation	Player
1	GK	ENG	Jos Barker
2	DF	ENG	Joy Mukena
3	DF	ENG	Jordan Norville-Williams
4	DF	ENG	Hayden Muller
5	DF	SCO	Jack Kingdon
6	DF	CGO	Loick Ayina (on loan from Salford City)
7	FW	ENG	Mason Obeng
10	MF	ENG	Ryan Jones
11	FW	ENG	James Daly
12	DF	ENG	Archie Davies
14	MF	ENG	Brett McGavin (captain)
15	DF	ENG	Joe Gubbins (vice-captain)

No.	Pos.	Nation	Player
16	DF	ENG	Ben Radcliffe (on loan from Crawley Town)
17	MF	ENG	Joe Haigh
18	FW	ENG	Owen Dean
19	FW	BUL	Slavi Spasov
20	MF	ENG	Johl Powell
22	GK	NZL	Matthew Gould
24	DF	ENG	Seb Naylor (on loan from Bristol City)
25	MF	ENG	Zain Westbrooke
27	FW	ENG	Charlie Lennon (on loan from Barnsley)
28	GK	ENG	Mason Terry (on loan from West Ham United)
35	DF	ENG	Dan Ellison

=== Out on loan ===
Note: Flags indicate national team as defined under FIFA eligibility rules; some limited exceptions apply. Players may hold more than one non-FIFA nationality.

No.	Pos.	Nation	Player
8	MF	ENG	Luke McCormick (at AFC Fylde until 13 January 2027)
37	MF	ENG	Liam Nardiello (at Sherborne Town)

== Club management ==
As of 13 August 2026

=== Corporate hierarchy ===
Position	Name
Owner / chairman	Prabhu Srinivasan
Directors	Ian Scobbie
Directors	Sahil Prabhu
Directors	Bhavna Vohra
Non-executive director	Stuart Robins
Chief operations officer	Nicholas Brayne
Club secretary	Kirstie Baker

=== Coaching staff ===
Position	Name
Manager	(England) Billy Rowley
Assistant manager	(England) Darren Simpson
Goalkeeper coach	(New Zealand) Matthew Gould
Head of sports science	(England) Glenn Shepherd
Lead sports therapist	(England) Joe McFarlane
Recruitment and scouting operations manager	(England) Jamie Hedges
U19s manager	(Republic of Ireland) Roy O'Brien

== Managerial history ==
Years	Manager
1923–28	(England) Jack Gregory
1928–29	(England) Tommy Lowes
1929–33	(Scotland) David Pratt
1933–35	(England) Louis Page
1935–38	(Scotland) Dave Halliday
1938–46	(England) Billy Kingdon
1946–49	(England) Alec Stock
1949–51	(Scotland) George Paterson
1951–53	(Scotland) Harry Lowe
1953–57	(England) Ike Clarke
1957	(England) Norman Dodgin
1957–60	(England) Jimmy Baldwin
1960–64	(England) Basil Hayward
1964–65	(Wales) Glyn Davies
1965–67	(Scotland) Joe McDonald

Years	Manager
1967–69	(England) Ron Saunders
1969–72	(Wales) Mike Hughes
1972–75	(England) Cecil Irwin
1975–78	(England) Stan Harland
1978–81	(England) Barry Lloyd
1981	(England) Malcolm Allison
1981–83	(England) Jimmy Giles
1983	(Wales) Mike Hughes
1983–84	(England) Trevor Finnigan
1984	(England) Steve Coles
1984	(Scotland) Ian MacFarlane
1984–87	(Scotland) Gerry Gow
1987–90	(England) Brian Hall
1990–91	(England) Clive Whitehead
1991–93	(England) Steve Rutter

Years	Manager
1994–95	(England) Brian Hall
1995–98	(England) Graham Roberts
1998–99	(England) Colin Lippiatt
1999–2000	(England) Steve Thompson
2000	(England) David Webb
2000	(England) Steve Thompson
2000–01	(England) Colin Addison
2001–05	(England) Gary Johnson
2005–06	(England) Steve Thompson
2006–09	(England) Russell Slade
2009	(England) Steve Thompson
2009–12	(England) Terry Skiverton
2012–15	(England) Gary Johnson
2015	(England) Terry Skiverton
2015	(Scotland) Paul Sturrock

Years	Manager
2015–19	(England) Darren Way
2019	(England) Neale Marmon
2019–22	(England) Darren Sarll
2022	(England) Charlie Lee
2022	(England) Josh Staunton
2022	(England) Chris Hargreaves
2022–25	(England) Mark Cooper
2025	(England) Richard Dryden
2025	(England) Danny Webb
2025	(England) Richard Dryden
2025–	(England) Billy Rowley

=== List of chairmen ===
The following men have been chairman of the club's Board of Directors:

Years	Chairman
1923–25	E.J. Farr
1925–27	E.P. Wrinch
1927–29	W. Stanley Johnson
1929–31	W.J. Farthing
1931–33	Stanley H. Vincent
1933–36	George E. Fox
1936–38	Stanley Gates
1938–48	H.A. Smith
1948–62	W.H. Farthing
1962–66	S. Pinder

Years	Chairman
1966–69	G.E. Templeman
1969–71	S. Norman Burfield
1971–74	I.B. Rendall
1974–82	David J. Hawker
1982–91	Gerry A. Lock
1991–96	Bryan W. Moore
1996–2019	John R. Fry
2019–23	Scott M. Priestnall
2023–25	Martin Hellier
2025–	Prabhu Srinivasan

== Honours ==
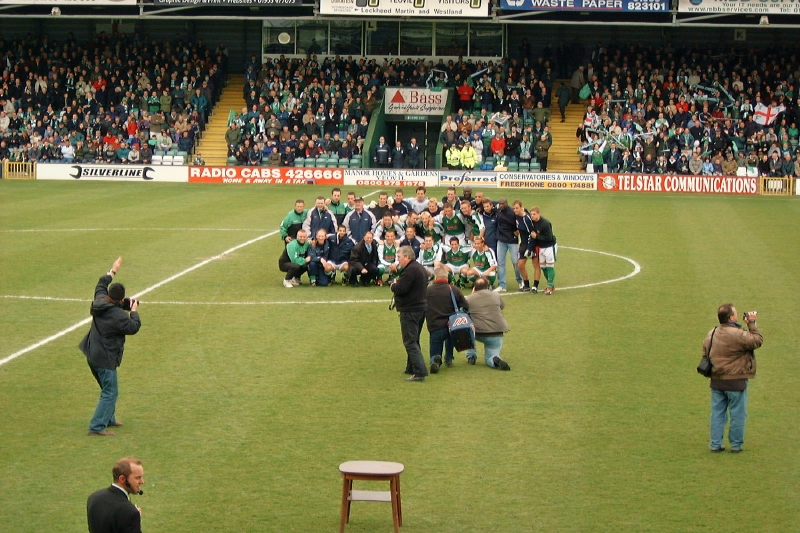
Yeovil celebrating their promotion to The Football League at Huish Park on 19 April 2003.

League

- League One (level 3)
  - Play-off winners: 2013
- League Two (level 4)
  - Champions: 2004–05
- Conference (level 5)
  - Champions: 2002–03
- National League South (level 6)
  - Champions: 2023–24
- Isthmian League (level 6)
  - Champions: 1987–88, 1996–97
- Southern League
  - Champions: 1954–55, 1963–64, 1970–71
- Southern League (Western Section)
  - Champions: 1923–24, 1931–32, 1934–35
- Western League
  - Champions: 1921–22, 1924–25, 1929–30, 1934–35
- Bristol Charity League
  - Champions: 1921–22
- Dorset District League
  - Champions: 1908–09
- Somerset Senior League
  - Champions: 1896–97, 1901–02, 1912–13, 1920–21

Cup

- FA Trophy
  - Winners: 2001–02
- Conference League Cup
  - Winners: 1989–90
- Southern League Championship Cup
  - Winners: 1971–72, 1976–77
- Southern League Cup
  - Winners: 1954–55, 1960–61, 1965–66
- Isthmian League Cup
  - Winners: 1987–88
- Isthmian Championship Shield
  - Winners: 1988–89
- Western League Cup
  - Winners: 1958–59
- Somerset Premier Cup
  - Winners (25): 1929–30, 1930–31, 1932–33, 1934–35, 1937–38, 1938–39, 1946–47 (jointly with Bath City), 1947–48, 1949–50, 1950–51, 1953–54, 1954–55, 1955–56, 1956–57 (jointly with Bristol City), 1961–62, 1962–63, 1964–65, 1968–69 (jointly with Frome Town), 1972–73, 1975–76, 1978–79, 1996–97, 1997–98, 2004–05, 2021–22 (record)
- Forse Somerset Charity Cup
  - Winners: 1910–11, 1912–13

=== Club records ===
- Most consecutive wins in all competitions: 14 (Note: Excludes the Somerset Premier Cup in which the club's youth team played.) 14 November 2023
- Most overall appearances: Len Harris, 691 (1958–72)
- Most goals: Johnny Hayward, 548 (1906–28)
- Most league goals: Dave Taylor, 284 (1960–9)
- Record attendance Football League at Huish Park: 9,527 vs. Leeds United, 25 April 2008 (League One)
- Record attendance all time: 17,123 vs. Sunderland, 29 January 1949 (FA Cup fourth round)
- Longest serving player: Len Harris, 14 years (1958–72)
- Longest serving manager: Billy Kingdon, 8 years (1938–46)
- Highest league finish: 24th Championship, 2013–14 season
- Highest transfer fee received: £1,200,000, Arron Davies and Chris Cohen, Nottingham Forest, July 2007
- Highest transfer fee paid: Undisclosed (five figure sum), Pablo Bastianini, Quilmes Atlético Club, August 2005
- Highest victory in the Football League: 6–0 vs. Newport County, 15 September 2018
- Heaviest defeat in the Football League: 0–6 vs. Stevenage, 14 April 2012, 2–8 vs. Luton Town, 5 August 2017

== Yeovil Town W.F.C. ==
After the merging of Bridgwater Town and Yeovil United (previously Yeovil Town Ladies) into Bridgwater United W.F.C. in 2021, the return of Yeovil Town's Women's Football Club (YTWFC) was announced in January 2023. In June, players from Sherborne Town Ladies and Ilminster Town Ladies were signed to the team ahead of the 2023-2024 season, as well as coaching staff from both clubs joining the team.

In September 2023, Yeovil Town W.F.C. joined the Somerset County Women's League, playing in Division One, with homes games at the Somerton Recreation Ground. In January 2024, the women's team reached the top of the division after winning 10 consecutive games.

=== Coaching staff ===
As 17 July 2025

Position	Name
Manager	Dave Court
Assistant manager	Matt Bennett
Goalkeeping coach	Tony Rich
