= List of Crawley Town F.C. seasons =

Crawley Town Football Club is an English association football club based in the town of Crawley, West Sussex. Founded in 1896 as Crawley F.C., the team played in junior leagues until 1951 when they were admitted to the Sussex County League as part of its attempted expansion. In their second season, they finished bottom of that league's First Division with only 4 points from 26 matches, but regulations prevented any team being relegated until the division reached its full complement of 16 teams. After another last-place finish two seasons later, they were relegated, but a runners-up spot in the Second Division in 1955–56 preceded a move into the Metropolitan & District League.

In 1958, under its new name of Crawley Town, the club entered the FA Cup for the first time; its team lost in the preliminary round at home to Horsham. It adopted professional status four years later, and entered the Southern League in 1963–64. Crawley gained promotion to that league's Premier Division for the 1969–70 season, but dropped straight back to Division One. When the league expanded to create two regional second-tier divisions, Crawley were placed in the southern division. They remained in the southern half when the creation of the Alliance Premier League as the top non-league division forced another restructure of the Southern League, this time with parallel Midland and Southern Divisions. Crawley's lowly finish in 1981–82 meant they failed to benefit from yet another reorganisation, whereby the top ten teams in each regional division formed a new Premier Division, but two years later they were promoted as runners-up.

They remained at that level for the next twenty years, until they won their first Southern League title in 2003–04 and consequent promotion to the new Conference National. Despite a variety of points deductions, including ten points in 2006–07 for entering administration and six the following season for financial irregularities, as well as a transfer embargo, they held on to their Conference status. In 2010–11, they not only progressed to the fifth round of the FA Cup, coming "within inches" of drawing with Manchester United at Old Trafford via Richard Brodie's header against the crossbar, they were not distracted from the league campaign; a 30-match unbeaten run and a Conference record 105 points earned them the 2010–11 title and promotion to the Football League. As well as reaching the FA Cup fifth round again, they came third in their first season in League Two, so went up to League One, where they remained for three seasons before returning to the fourth tier. Having narrowly avoided a return to non-league football in 2023, results on the final day of the 2023–24 season meant Crawley finished in the play-off places. They beat Milton Keynes Dons 8–1 on aggregate in the semi-final, an EFL play-off record, and in their first ever match at Wembley Stadium, beat Crewe Alexandra 2–0 to gain promotion to League One.

The table details the team's achievements in senior first-team competitions and the top league goalscorer(s) from Crawley's first season in the Sussex County League in 1951–52 to the end of the most recently completed season.

== Key ==
Key to league record:

- Pld – Matches played
- W – Matches won
- D – Matches drawn
- L – Matches lost
- GF – Goals for
- GA – Goals against
- Pts – Points
- Pos – Final position

Key to colours and symbols:
Symbol	Meaning
↑	Promoted
↓	Relegated
♦	Top league scorer in Crawley's division

Key to divisions:

- Sussex – Sussex County League
- Sussex 1 – Sussex County League First Division
- Sussex 2 – Sussex County League Second Division
- Met & D – Metropolitan & District League
- Met – Metropolitan League
- South P – Southern League Premier Division
- South S – Southern League Southern Section
- South 1 – Southern League First Division
- South 1S – Southern League First Division Southern Section
- Conf – Conference National
- League One – Football League One
- League Two – Football League Two, EFL League Two

Key to rounds:

- Group – Group stage
- Prelim – Preliminary round
- QR1 – First qualifying round
- QR2 – Second qualifying round, etc.
- R1 – First round
- R2 – Second round, etc.
- QF – Quarter-final
- F – Final
- (S) – Southern section of regionalised stage

== Seasons ==
List of seasons, including league division and statistics, cup results and top league scorer(s)
Season	League									FA Cup	League Cup	Other		Top league scorer(s)	
Season	Division (Note: Divisions are sorted according to their level within the English football league system at the time.)	Pld	W	D	L	GF	GA	Pts	Pos	FA Cup	League Cup	Competition	Result	Player(s)	Goals
1951–52	Sussex	28	7	7	14	57	89	21	13th	—	—	—	—	Not known	—
1952–53	Sussex 1	26	1	2	23	30	112	4	14th	—	—	—	—	Not known	—
1953–54	Sussex 1	28	11	2	15	55	70	24	11th	—	—	—	—	Not known	—
1954–55	Sussex 1 ↓	32	10	4	18	47	70	24	17th	—	—	—	—	Not known	—
1955–56	Sussex 2	26	20	2	4	96	28	41	2nd	—	—	—	—	Not known	—
1956–57	Met & D	34	9	7	18	61	75	25	14th	—	—	—	—	Not known	—
1957–58	Met & D	34	12	7	15	70	75	31	11th	—	—	—	—	Not known	—
1958–59	Met & D	36	12	7	17	65	86	31	14th	Prelim	—	—	—	Not known	—
1959–60	Met	38	9	2	27	52	116	20	20th	QR3	—	—	—	Not known	—
1960–61	Met	34	5	4	25	39	123	14	17th	QR1	—	—	—	Not known	—
1961–62	Met	32	19	2	11	90	55	40	5th	QR4	—	—	—	Not known	—
1962–63	Met	32	19	4	9	82	49	42	6th	QR3	—	—	—	Not known	—
1963–64	South 1	42	20	2	20	81	71	42	12th	QR4	—	—	—	Not known	—
1964–65	South 1	42	22	5	15	83	52	49	7th	QR4	—	—	—	Not known	—
1965–66	South 1	46	17	10	19	72	71	44	12th	QR4	—	—	—	Not known	—
1966–67	South 1	46	26	8	12	81	48	60	6th	QR3	—	—	—	Not known	—
1967–68	South 1	42	10	8	24	54	85	28	18th	QR3	—	—	—	Not known	—
1968–69	South 1 ↑	42	21	13	8	65	32	55	4th	QR1	—	—	—	Not known	—
1969–70	South P ↓	42	6	15	21	53	101	27	21st	QR4	—	FA Trophy	QR2	Not known	—
1970–71	South 1	38	15	11	12	84	68	41	10th	R1	—	FA Trophy	QR1	Not known	—
1971–72	South 1S	30	15	5	10	67	55	35	4th	R1	—	FA Trophy	QR2	Not known	—
1972–73	South 1S	42	14	11	17	59	76	39	14th	QR4	—	FA Trophy	QR2	Not known	—
1973–74	South 1S	38	6	9	23	35	79	21	20th	QR2	—	FA Trophy	QR2	Not known	—
1974–75	South 1S	38	3	5	30	31	102	11	20th	QR2	—	FA Trophy	Prelim	Not known	—
1975–76	South 1S	38	9	10	19	46	66	28	18th	QR4	—	FA Trophy	QR1	Not known	—
1976–77	South 1S	34	14	9	11	53	42	37	9th	QR1	—	FA Trophy	Prelim	Not known	—
1977–78	South 1S	38	14	9	15	61	60	37	12th	QR3	—	FA Trophy	QR2	Not known	—
1978–79	South 1S	40	9	9	22	44	75	27	20th	QR2	—	FA Trophy	QR1	Not known	—
1979–80	South S	46	13	11	22	55	72	37	20th	QR1	—	FA Trophy	Prelim	Not known	—
1980–81	South S	46	18	4	24	64	78	40	15th	QR2	—	FA Trophy	QR2	Not known	—
1981–82	South S	46	9	12	25	46	81	30	21st	QR1	—	FA Trophy	QR1	Not known	—
1982–83	South S	34	14	9	11	51	43	51 (Note: The 1982–83 season saw the introduction of three points for a win instead of two in the Southern League.)	7th	QR1	—	FA Trophy	QR3	Not known	—
1983–84	South S ↑	38	22	9	7	68	28	75	2nd	Prelim	—	FA Trophy	QR3	Not known	—
1984–85	South P	38	22	8	8	76	52	74	3rd	QR2	—	FA Trophy	QR1	Not known	—
1985–86	South P	38	18	5	15	76	59	59	6th	QR3	—	FA Trophy	R2	Not known	—
1986–87	South P	42	14	11	17	59	60	53	13th	QR3	—	FA Trophy	R1	Not known	—
1987–88	South P	42	17	14	11	73	63	65	6th	QR1	—	FA Trophy	R2	Not known	—
1988–89	South P	42	14	16	12	61	56	58	12th	QR4	—	FA Trophy	QR3	Not known	—
1989–90	South P	42	13	12	17	53	57	51	15th	QR1	—	FA Trophy	QR3	Not known	—
1990–91	South P	42	12	12	18	45	67	48	19th	QR2	—	FA Trophy	QR2	Not known	—
1991–92	South P	42	12	12	18	62	67	48	17th	R3	—	FA Trophy	QR1	Not known	—
1992–93	South P	40	16	12	12	68	59	60	6th	QR4	—	FA Trophy	QR2	Not known	—
1993–94	South P	42	21	10	11	56	42	73	5th	R2	—	FA Trophy	QR3	Not known	—
1994–95	South P	42	15	10	17	64	71	55	11th	R1	—	FA Trophy	QR3	Not known	—
1995–96	South P	42	15	13	14	57	56	58	9th	QR4	—	FA Trophy	QR2	Not known	—
1996–97	South P	42	13	8	21	49	67	47	7th	QR2	—	FA Trophy	QR3	Not known	—
1997–98	South P	42	17	8	17	63	60	59	10th	QR1	—	FA Trophy	QR2	Not known	—
1998–99	South P	42	17	10	15	57	58	61	11th	QR4	—	FA Trophy	R3	Not known	—
1999–2000	South P	42	15	8	19	68	82	53	12th	QR2	—	FA Trophy	R2	Not known	—
2000–01	South P	42	17	10	15	61	54	61	11th	QR2	—	FA Trophy	R3	Not known	—
2001–02	South P	42	21	10	11	67	48	73	4th	QR3	—	FA Trophy	R1	Not known	—
2002–03	South P	42	17	13	12	64	51	64	7th	R2	—	FA Trophy	R3	Not known	—
2003–04	South P ↑	42	25	9	8	77	43	84	1st	R1	—	FA Trophy	R3	Charlie MacDonald	17
2004–05	Conf	42	16	9	17	50	50	57	12th	QR4	—	FA Trophy	R4	Allan Tait	10
2005–06	Conf	42	12	11	19	48	55	44 (Note: Three-point deduction for exceeding their annual playing budget as agreed with the Football Conference.)	17th	QR4	—	FA Trophy; Football League Trophy	R3; R1(S)	Daryl Clare	11
2006–07	Conf	46	17	12	17	52	52	53 (Note: Ten-point deduction for entering administration.)	18th	QR4	—	FA Trophy	R1	Scott Rendell	11
2007–08	Conf	46	19	9	18	73	67	60 (Note: Six-point deduction for financial irregularities.)	15th	QR4	—	FA Trophy	QF	Jamie Cook	16
2008–09	Conf	46	19	14	13	77	55	70 (Note: One-point deduction for fielding an ineligible player.)	9th	QR4	—	FA Trophy	R3	Jamie Cook	13
2009–10	Conf	44	19	9	16	50	57	66	7th	QR4	—	FA Trophy	R2	Charles Ademeno	11
2010–11	Conf ↑	46	31	12	3	93	30	105	1st	R5	—	FA Trophy	R1	Matt Tubbs	37 ♦
2011–12	League Two ↑	46	23	15	8	76	54	84	3rd	R5	R1	Football League Trophy	R1(S)	Tyrone Barnett	14
2012–13	League One	46	18	14	14	59	58	68	10th	R3	R3	Football League Trophy	R2(S)	Billy Clarke	10
2013–14	League One	46	14	15	17	48	54	57	14th	R2	R1	Football League Trophy	R2(S)	Matt Tubbs	8
2014–15	League One ↓	46	13	11	22	53	79	50	22nd	R1	R2	Football League Trophy	QF(S)	Izale McLeod	19
2015–16	League Two	46	13	8	25	45	78	47	20th	R1	R1	Football League Trophy	R2(S)	Rhys Murphy	9
2016–17	League Two	46	13	12	21	53	71	51	19th	R1	R1	EFL Trophy	R2(S)	James Collins	20
2017–18	League Two	46	16	11	19	58	66	69	14th	R1	R1	EFL Trophy	Group (S)	Enzio Boldewijn; Jimmy Smith	10
2018–19	League Two	46	15	8	23	51	68	53	19th	R1	R1	EFL Trophy	Group (S)	Ollie Palmer	14
2019–20	League Two	37	11	15	11	51	47	48	13th (Note: Because of the COVID-19 pandemic, the season was suspended in March 2020, and Leagues One and Two were concluded prematurely in June, with league positions and promotions decided on a points-per-game basis. Crawley lay 12th on points but finished 13th on points per game.)	R2	R4	EFL Trophy	Group (S)	Ollie Palmer	13
2020–21	League Two	46	16	13	17	56	62	61	12th	R4	R1	EFL Trophy	Group (S)	Max Watters	13
2021–22	League Two	46	17	10	19	56	66	61	12th	R1	R1	EFL Trophy	Group (S)	Kwesi Appiah	11
2022–23	League Two	46	11	13	22	48	71	46	22nd	R1	R3	EFL Trophy	Group (S)	Dom Telford	12
2023–24	League Two ↑	46	21	7	18	73	67	70	7th (Note: Promoted via the play-offs after beating Mansfield Town 8–1 in the semi-final and Crewe Alexandra 2–0 in the final.)	R1	R1	EFL Trophy	R3 (S)	Danilo Orsi	19
2024–25	League One ↓	46	12	10	24	57	83	46	21st	R2	R2	EFL Trophy	Group (S)	Rushian Hepburn-Murphy	10
