= 1977–78 Southern Football League =

The 1977–78 Southern Football League season was the 75th in the history of the league, an English football competition.

Bath City won the championship, winning their second Southern League title, whilst Witney Town, Margate, Bridgend Town and Dorchester Town were all promoted to the Premier Division, the former two as champions. Romford folded at the end of the season.

== Premier Division ==
The Premier Division consisted of 22 clubs, including 18 clubs from the previous season and four new clubs:

- Two clubs promoted from Division One North:
  - Cheltenham Town
  - Worcester City
- Two clubs promoted from Division One South:
  - Barnet
  - Hastings United

=== League table ===
Southern Football League Premier Division
- Season: 1977–78
- Champions: Bath City
- Relegated: Bedford Town; Dover; Grantham; Minehead
- Matches: 462
- Goals: 1,136 (2.46 per match)

Pos	Team	Pld	W	D	L	GF	GA	GD	Pts	Promotion or relegation
1	Bath City	42	22	18	2	83	32	+51	62	
2	Weymouth	42	21	16	5	64	36	+28	58	
3	Maidstone United	42	20	11	11	59	41	+18	51	
4	Worcester City	42	20	11	11	67	50	+17	51	
5	Gravesend & Northfleet	42	19	11	12	57	42	+15	49	
6	Kettering Town	42	18	11	13	58	48	+10	47	
7	Barnet	42	18	11	13	63	58	+5	47	
8	Wealdstone	42	16	14	12	54	48	+6	46	
9	Telford United	42	17	11	14	52	45	+7	45	
10	Nuneaton Borough	42	15	14	13	38	36	+2	44	
11	Dartford	42	14	15	13	57	65	−8	43	
12	Yeovil Town	42	14	14	14	57	49	+8	42	
13	Hastings United	42	15	9	18	49	60	−11	39	
14	Cheltenham Town	42	12	14	16	43	52	−9	38	
15	Hillingdon Borough	42	13	9	20	45	54	−9	35	
16	Atherstone Town	42	10	15	17	41	56	−15	35	
17	Redditch United	42	15	5	22	40	55	−15	35	
18	AP Leamington	42	11	13	18	34	57	−23	35	
19	Minehead	42	11	12	19	43	48	−5	34	Relegated to Division One South
20	Dover	42	9	13	20	41	63	−22	31	Relegated to Division One South
21	Bedford Town	42	8	13	21	51	75	−24	29	Relegated to Division One North
22	Grantham	42	11	6	25	40	66	−26	28	Relegated to Division One North

Source: fchd.com rsssf.com
Rules for classification: 1) points; 2) goal difference; 3) number of goals scored.

== Division One North ==
Division One North consisted of 20 clubs, including 18 clubs from the previous season and two new clubs:

- Bridgend Town, joined from the Welsh Football League
- Burton Albion, relegated from the Premier Division

=== League table ===
Southern Football League Division One North
- Season: 1977–78
- Champions: Witney Town
- Promoted: Bridgend Town; Witney Town
- Matches: 380
- Goals: 1,030 (2.71 per match)

Pos	Team	Pld	W	D	L	GF	GA	GD	Pts	Promotion or relegation
1	Witney Town	38	20	15	3	54	27	+27	55	Promoted to the Premier Division
2	Bridgend Town	38	20	9	9	59	45	+14	49	Promoted to the Premier Division
3	Burton Albion	38	17	11	10	48	32	+16	45	
4	Enderby Town	38	17	10	11	59	44	+15	44	
5	Bromsgrove Rovers	38	16	12	10	56	41	+15	44	
6	Banbury United	38	17	10	11	52	47	+5	44	
7	Kidderminster Harriers	38	16	11	11	58	41	+17	43	
8	Merthyr Tydfil	38	18	6	14	85	62	+23	42	
9	Cambridge City	38	14	12	12	56	45	+11	40	
10	Barry Town	38	14	11	13	58	48	+10	39	
11	Wellingborough Town	38	11	15	12	47	43	+4	37	
12	King's Lynn	38	12	13	13	55	55	0	37	
13	Gloucester City	38	14	8	16	68	75	−7	36	
14	Corby Town	38	9	17	12	46	48	−2	35	
15	Dunstable	38	11	13	14	49	59	−10	35	Transferred to the Division One South
16	Stourbridge	38	9	15	14	52	53	−1	33	
17	Tamworth	38	10	11	17	37	48	−11	31	
18	Bedworth United	38	8	14	16	36	58	−22	30	
19	Milton Keynes City	38	5	11	22	26	74	−48	21	
20	Oswestry Town	38	6	8	24	29	85	−56	20	

Source: fchd.com rsssf.com
Rules for classification: 1) points; 2) goal difference; 3) number of goals scored.

== Division One South ==
Division One South expanded up to 20 clubs, including 15 clubs from the previous season and five new clubs:

- Two clubs, relegated from the Premier Division
  - Chelmsford City
  - Margate
- Two clubs joined from the Athenian League
  - Addlestone
  - Hounslow
- Plus:
  - Taunton Town, joined from the Western League

=== League table ===
Southern Football League Division One South
- Season: 1977–78
- Champions: Margate
- Promoted: Dorchester Town; Margate
- Matches: 380
- Goals: 1,107 (2.91 per match)

Pos	Team	Pld	W	D	L	GF	GA	GD	Pts	Promotion or relegation
1	Margate	38	24	10	4	92	32	+60	58	Promoted to the Premier Division
2	Dorchester Town	38	23	10	5	67	31	+36	56	Promoted to the Premier Division
3	Salisbury	38	21	10	7	60	27	+33	52	
4	Waterlooville	38	19	13	6	66	36	+30	51	
5	Romford	38	17	15	6	58	37	+21	49	Club folded
6	Aylesbury United	38	20	7	11	56	42	+14	47	
7	Trowbridge Town	38	16	11	11	65	59	+6	43	
8	Chelmsford City	38	15	11	12	58	46	+12	41	
9	Folkestone & Shepway	38	16	9	13	64	56	+8	41	
10	Taunton Town	38	15	10	13	57	54	+3	40	
11	Addlestone	38	14	10	14	57	60	−3	38	
12	Crawley Town	38	14	9	15	61	60	+1	37	
13	Basingstoke Town	38	11	11	16	44	50	−6	33	
14	Tonbridge Angels	38	13	5	20	64	77	−13	31	
15	Ashford Town (Kent)	38	9	13	16	39	60	−21	31	
16	Hounslow	38	10	10	18	43	62	−19	30	
17	Bognor Regis Town	38	9	8	21	52	69	−17	26	
18	Poole Town	38	8	10	20	43	68	−25	26	
19	Andover	38	4	12	22	30	68	−38	20	
20	Canterbury City	38	2	6	30	31	113	−82	10	

Source: fchd.com rsssf.com
Rules for classification: 1) points; 2) goal difference; 3) number of goals scored.

== Football League elections ==
At the end of the season, the bottom four of the Football League had to be re-elected to retain their place, with one club from each of the Southern League and Northern Premier League also on the ballot. Champions Bath City participated in the vote, but finished bottom. NPL club Wigan Athletic were elected to the League after beating Southport in a second round of voting.

Club	League	First round votes	Second round votes
York City	Football League Division Four	49	
Rochdale	Football League Division Four	39	
Hartlepool United	Football League Division Four	37	
Wigan Athletic	Northern Premier League	26	29
Southport	Football League Division Four	26	20
Bath City	Southern League	23	

== See also ==
- Southern Football League
- 1977–78 Northern Premier League
