= 1976–77 Southern Football League =

The 1976–77 Southern Football League season was the 74th in the history of the league, an English football competition. It was the first Southern Football League season to use goal difference as a tie-breaker.

Wimbledon won the championship, winning their third Southern League title in a row and was elected to the Football League replacing Workington, whilst Worcester City, Barnet, Cheltenham Town and Hastings United were all promoted to the Premier Division, the former two as champions. Metropolitan Police left the league to join the Isthmian League.

== Premier Division ==
The Premier Division consisted of 22 clubs, including 18 clubs from the previous season and four new clubs:

- Two clubs promoted from Division One North:
  - Redditch United
  - AP Leamington
- Two clubs promoted from Division One South:
  - Dartford
  - Minehead

Wimbledon was elected to the Football League in place of Workington. Thus, Telford United remained in the division.

=== League table ===
Southern Football League Premier Division
- Season: 1976–77
- Champions: Wimbledon
- Relegated: Burton Albion; Chelmsford City; Margate
- Matches: 462
- Goals: 1,113 (2.41 per match)

Pos	Team	Pld	W	D	L	GF	GA	GD	Pts	Promotion or relegation
1	Wimbledon	42	28	7	7	64	22	+42	63	Elected to the Football League Fourth Division
2	Minehead	42	23	12	7	73	39	+34	58	
3	Kettering Town	42	20	16	6	66	46	+20	56	
4	Bath City	42	20	15	7	51	30	+21	55	
5	Nuneaton Borough	42	20	11	11	52	35	+17	51	
6	Bedford Town	42	17	14	11	54	47	+7	48	
7	Yeovil Town	42	15	16	11	54	42	+12	46	
8	Dover	42	13	16	13	46	43	+3	42	
9	Grantham	42	14	12	16	55	50	+5	40	
10	Maidstone United	42	13	14	15	46	50	−4	40	
11	Gravesend & Northfleet	42	13	13	16	38	43	−5	39	
12	AP Leamington	42	12	15	15	44	53	−9	39	
13	Redditch United	42	12	14	16	45	54	−9	38	
14	Wealdstone	42	13	12	17	54	66	−12	38	
15	Hillingdon Borough	42	14	10	18	45	59	−14	38	
16	Atherstone Town	42	14	9	19	41	49	−8	37	
17	Weymouth	42	16	5	21	53	73	−20	37	
18	Dartford	42	13	10	19	52	57	−5	36	
19	Telford United	42	11	12	19	36	50	−14	34	Reprieved from relegation
20	Chelmsford City	42	9	13	20	56	68	−12	31	Relegated to Division One South
21	Burton Albion	42	10	10	22	41	52	−11	30	Relegated to Division One North
22	Margate	42	9	10	23	47	85	−38	28	Relegated to Division One South

Source: fchd.com rsssf.com
Rules for classification: 1) points; 2) goal difference; 3) number of goals scored.

== Division One North ==
Division One North consisted of 20 clubs, including 17 clubs from the previous season and three clubs, all from the Premier Division:

- Cambridge City
- Dunstable
- Stourbridge

=== League table ===
Southern Football League Division One North
- Season: 1976–77
- Champions: Worcester City
- Promoted: Cheltenham Town; Worcester City
- Matches: 380
- Goals: 1,169 (3.08 per match)

Pos	Team	Pld	W	D	L	GF	GA	GD	Pts	Promotion or relegation
1	Worcester City	38	32	5	1	97	22	+75	69	Promoted to the Premier Division
2	Cheltenham Town	38	23	8	7	85	35	+50	54	Promoted to the Premier Division
3	Witney Town	38	21	8	9	48	31	+17	50	
4	Bromsgrove Rovers	38	20	8	10	61	37	+24	48	
5	Barry Town	38	19	8	11	62	45	+17	46	
6	Cambridge City	38	17	10	11	68	43	+25	44	
7	Stourbridge	38	17	9	12	48	35	+13	43	
8	Kidderminster Harriers	38	17	6	15	74	65	+9	40	
9	Banbury United	38	15	10	13	51	47	+4	40	
10	Gloucester City	38	18	4	16	70	81	−11	40	
11	Enderby Town	38	15	9	14	50	44	+6	39	
12	King's Lynn	38	13	11	14	47	53	−6	37	
13	Corby Town	38	11	13	14	56	64	−8	35	
14	Tamworth	38	11	13	14	49	58	−9	35	
15	Merthyr Tydfil	38	12	6	20	60	69	−9	30	
16	Oswestry Town	38	8	10	20	30	60	−30	26	
17	Wellingborough Town	38	8	7	23	37	73	−36	23	
18	Dunstable	38	7	7	24	38	84	−46	21	
19	Bedworth United	38	5	10	23	28	68	−40	20	
20	Milton Keynes City	38	7	6	25	31	76	−45	20	

Source: fchd.com rsssf.com
Rules for classification: 1) points; 2) goal difference; 3) number of goals scored.

== Division One South ==
Division One South consisted of 18 clubs, including 15 clubs from the previous season and three new clubs:

- Aylesbury United, promoted from the Athenian League
- Barnet, transferred from the North Division
- Tonbridge Angels, demoted from the Premier Division

=== League table ===
Southern Football League Division One South
- Season: 1976–77
- Champions: Barnet
- Promoted: Barnet; Hastings United
- Matches: 306
- Goals: 759 (2.48 per match)

Pos	Team	Pld	W	D	L	GF	GA	GD	Pts	Promotion or relegation
1	Barnet	34	23	8	3	65	25	+40	54	Promoted to the Premier Division
2	Hastings United	34	18	11	5	47	18	+29	47	Promoted to the Premier Division
3	Waterlooville	34	19	6	9	50	25	+25	44	
4	Dorchester Town	34	16	11	7	48	30	+18	43	
5	Salisbury	34	15	11	8	57	39	+18	41	
6	Romford	34	18	5	11	47	32	+15	41	
7	Poole Town	34	17	7	10	40	35	+5	41	
8	Trowbridge Town	34	15	8	11	47	39	+8	38	
9	Crawley Town	34	14	9	11	53	42	+11	37	
10	Folkestone & Shepway	34	12	11	11	39	42	−3	35	
11	Basingstoke Town	34	12	10	12	51	43	+8	34	
12	Canterbury City	34	6	16	12	36	46	−10	28	
13	Bognor Regis Town	34	9	9	16	33	50	−17	27	
14	Tonbridge Angels	34	9	9	16	33	50	−17	27	
15	Metropolitan Police	34	5	12	17	37	61	−24	22	Transferred to the Isthmian League Division Two
16	Andover	34	4	11	19	17	49	−32	19	
17	Ashford Town (Kent)	34	5	8	21	32	65	−33	18	
18	Aylesbury United	34	5	6	23	27	68	−41	16	
19	Guildford & Dorking United	0	0	0	0	0	0	0	0	Club folded, record expunged

Source: fchd.com rsssf.com
Rules for classification: 1) points; 2) goal difference; 3) number of goals scored.

== Football League elections ==
At the end of the season, the bottom four of the Football League had to be re-elected to retain their place. Whilst in previous seasons the number of non-League applicants had been unlimited, this season saw the Football League Management Committee limit the number to two, with Wimbledon and Northern Premier League members Altrincham (who had finished tenth) entering the ballot. The top four in the vote would retain/win a place in the League.

With 27 votes, Wimbledon finished fourth in the election, earning a place in the League at the expense of Workington, who dropped into the Northern Premier League.

Club	League	Votes
Halifax Town	Football League Division Four	44
Hartlepool	Football League Division Four	42
Southport	Football League Division Four	37
Wimbledon	Southern League Premier Division	27
Workington	Football League Division Four	21
Altrincham	Northern Premier League	12

== See also ==
- Southern Football League
- 1976–77 Northern Premier League
