= 1974–75 Southern Football League =

The 1974–75 Southern Football League season was the 72nd in the history of the league, an English football competition.

Wimbledon won the championship, winning their first Southern League title, whilst Bedford Town, Dunstable Town, Gravesend & Northfleet and Hillingdon Borough were all promoted to the Premier Division. Eight Southern League clubs applied to join the Football League at the end of the season, but none were successful.

== Premier Division ==
The Premier Division consisted of 22 clubs, including 18 clubs from the previous season and four new clubs:

- Two clubs promoted from Division One North:
  - Burton Albion
  - Stourbridge
- Two clubs promoted from Division One South:
  - Bath City
  - Wealdstone

=== League table ===
Southern Football League Premier Division
- Season: 1974–75
- Champions: Wimbledon
- Relegated: Barnet; Dartford; Guildford & Dorking United; Romford
- Matches: 462
- Goals: 1,233 (2.67 per match)

Pos	Team	Pld	W	D	L	GF	GA	GR	Pts	Promotion or relegation
1	Wimbledon	42	25	7	10	63	33	1.909	57	
2	Nuneaton Borough	42	23	8	11	56	37	1.514	54	
3	Yeovil Town	42	21	9	12	64	34	1.882	51	
4	Kettering Town	42	20	10	12	73	41	1.780	50	
5	Burton Albion	42	18	13	11	54	48	1.125	49	
6	Bath City	42	20	8	14	63	50	1.260	48	
7	Margate	42	17	12	13	64	64	1.000	46	
8	Wealdstone	42	17	11	14	62	61	1.016	45	
9	Telford United	42	16	13	13	55	56	0.982	45	
10	Chelmsford City	42	16	12	14	62	51	1.216	44	
11	Grantham	42	16	11	15	70	62	1.129	43	
12	Dover	42	15	13	14	43	53	0.811	43	
13	Maidstone United	42	15	12	15	52	50	1.040	42	
14	Atherstone Town	42	14	14	14	48	53	0.906	42	
15	Weymouth	42	13	13	16	66	58	1.138	39	
16	Stourbridge	42	13	12	17	56	70	0.800	38	
17	Cambridge City	42	11	14	17	51	56	0.911	36	
18	Tonbridge	42	11	12	19	44	66	0.667	34	
19	Romford	42	10	13	19	46	62	0.742	33	Relegated to Division One South
20	Dartford	42	9	13	20	52	70	0.743	31	Relegated to Division One South
21	Barnet	42	10	9	23	44	76	0.579	29	Relegated to Division One North
22	Guildford & Dorking United	42	10	5	27	45	82	0.549	25	Relegated to Division One South

Source: fchd.com rsssf.com
Rules for classification: 1) points; 2) goal ratio.

== Division One North ==
Division One North consisted of 22 clubs, including 20 clubs from the previous season and two clubs, relegated from the Premier Division:

- Bedford Town
- Worcester City

Also, at the end of the previous season Bletchley Town was renamed Milton Keynes City.

=== League table ===
Southern Football League Division One North
- Season: 1974–75
- Champions: Bedford Town
- Promoted: Bedford Town; Dunstable Town
- Matches: 462
- Goals: 1,383 (2.99 per match)

Pos	Team	Pld	W	D	L	GF	GA	GR	Pts	Promotion or relegation
1	Bedford Town	42	28	9	5	85	33	2.576	65	Promoted to the Premier Division
2	Dunstable Town	42	25	8	9	105	61	1.721	58	Promoted to the Premier Division
3	AP Leamington	42	25	7	10	68	48	1.417	57	
4	Redditch United	42	22	12	8	76	40	1.900	56	
5	Worcester City	42	24	8	10	84	50	1.680	56	
6	Cheltenham Town	42	21	9	12	72	53	1.358	51	
7	Tamworth	42	21	8	13	74	53	1.396	50	
8	King's Lynn	42	19	10	13	71	64	1.109	48	
9	Enderby Town	42	17	12	13	61	48	1.271	46	
10	Banbury United	42	18	10	14	52	51	1.020	46	
11	Stevenage Athletic	42	16	13	13	62	48	1.292	45	
12	Bromsgrove Rovers	42	18	9	15	63	52	1.212	45	
13	Merthyr Tydfil	42	11	15	16	53	64	0.828	37	
14	Witney Town	42	16	4	22	57	76	0.750	36	
15	Corby Town	42	11	13	18	60	57	1.053	35	
16	Kidderminster Harriers	42	12	11	19	50	66	0.758	35	
17	Gloucester City	42	13	8	21	55	75	0.733	34	
18	Wellingborough Town	42	9	13	20	42	61	0.689	31	
19	Barry Town	42	10	10	22	49	73	0.671	30	
20	Bedworth United	42	9	9	24	60	91	0.659	27	
21	Milton Keynes City	42	7	5	30	48	100	0.480	19	
22	Bury Town	42	5	7	30	36	119	0.303	17	

Source: fchd.com rsssf.com
Rules for classification: 1) points; 2) goal ratio.

== Division One South ==
Division One South consisted of 20 clubs, including 18 clubs from the previous season and two clubs, relegated from the Premier Division:

- Folkestone, who was renamed Folkestone & Shepway at the end of the previous season
- Hillingdon Borough

=== League table ===
Southern Football League Division One South
- Season: 1974–75
- Champions: Gravesend & Northfleet
- Promoted: Gravesend & Northfleet; Hillingdon Borough
- Matches: 380
- Goals: 1,127 (2.97 per match)

Pos	Team	Pld	W	D	L	GF	GA	GR	Pts	Promotion or relegation
1	Gravesend & Northfleet	38	24	12	2	70	30	2.333	60	Promoted to the Premier Division
2	Hillingdon Borough	38	22	8	8	87	45	1.933	52	Promoted to the Premier Division
3	Minehead	38	21	9	8	74	33	2.242	51	
4	Ramsgate	38	19	11	8	70	37	1.892	49	
5	Bexley United	38	19	7	12	61	44	1.386	45	
6	Waterlooville	38	17	11	10	67	49	1.367	45	
7	Ashford Town (Kent)	38	16	12	10	64	55	1.164	44	
8	Basingstoke Town	38	16	11	11	64	50	1.280	43	
9	Canterbury City	38	16	9	13	54	43	1.256	41	
10	Hastings United	38	13	14	11	54	45	1.200	40	
11	Poole Town	38	11	13	14	50	60	0.833	35	
12	Metropolitan Police	38	11	13	14	54	66	0.818	35	
13	Folkestone & Shepway	38	10	14	14	53	57	0.930	34	
14	Andover	38	12	8	18	52	71	0.732	32	
15	Bognor Regis Town	38	10	11	17	49	64	0.766	31	
16	Salisbury	38	9	11	18	45	66	0.682	29	
17	Trowbridge Town	38	10	9	19	48	76	0.632	29	
18	Bideford	38	10	8	20	40	71	0.563	28	Resigned to the Western Football League
19	Dorchester Town	38	8	10	20	40	63	0.635	26	
20	Crawley Town	38	3	5	30	31	102	0.304	11	

Source: fchd.com rsssf.com
Rules for classification: 1) points; 2) goal ratio.

== Football League elections ==
Alongside the four League clubs facing re-election, a total of 12 non-League clubs applied for election, eight of which were Southern League clubs. All the League clubs were re-elected.

Club	League	Votes
Swansea City	Football League	43
Scunthorpe United	Football League	41
Darlington	Football League	32
Workington	Football League	28
Kettering Town	Southern League	20
Yeovil Town	Southern League	8
Wimbledon	Southern League	4
Bedford Town	Southern League	2
Goole Town	Northern Premier League	2
Scarborough	Northern Premier League	2
Gainsborough Trinity	Northern Premier League	1
Nuneaton Borough	Southern League	1
Telford United	Southern League	1
Weymouth	Southern League	1
Boston United	Northern Premier League	0
Chelmsford City	Southern League	0

== See also ==
- Southern Football League
- 1974–75 Northern Premier League
