= 1973–74 Southern Football League =

The 1973–74 Southern Football League season was the 71st in the history of the league, an English football competition.

Dartford won the championship, winning their third Southern League title, whilst Burton Albion, Stourbridge, Bath City and Wealdstone were all promoted to the Premier Division. Six Southern League clubs applied to join the Football League at the end of the season, but none were successful.

== Premier Division ==
The Premier Division consisted of 22 clubs, including 18 clubs from the previous season and four new clubs:

- Two clubs promoted from Division One North:
  - Atherstone Town
  - Grantham
- Two clubs promoted from Division One South:
  - Maidstone United
  - Tonbridge

At the end of the season Guildford City, who lost its ground earlier, merged with Dorking to form a new club Guildford & Dorking United. Also, Folkestone was renamed Folkestone and Shepway.

=== League table ===
Southern Football League Premier Division
- Season: 1973–74
- Champions: Dartford
- Relegated: Bedford Town; Folkestone; Hillingdon Borough; Worcester City
- Matches: 462
- Goals: 1,149 (2.49 per match)

Pos	Team	Pld	W	D	L	GF	GA	GR	Pts	Promotion or relegation
1	Dartford	42	22	13	7	67	37	1.811	57	
2	Grantham	42	18	13	11	70	49	1.429	49	
3	Chelmsford City	42	19	10	13	62	49	1.265	48	
4	Kettering Town	42	16	16	10	62	51	1.216	48	
5	Maidstone United	42	16	14	12	54	43	1.256	46	
6	Yeovil Town	42	13	20	9	45	39	1.154	46	
7	Weymouth	42	19	7	16	60	41	1.463	45	
8	Barnet	42	18	9	15	55	46	1.196	45	
9	Nuneaton Borough	42	13	19	10	54	47	1.149	45	
10	Cambridge City	42	15	12	15	45	54	0.833	42	
11	Atherstone Town	42	16	9	17	61	59	1.034	41	
12	Wimbledon	42	15	11	16	50	56	0.893	41	
13	Telford United	42	12	16	14	51	57	0.895	40	
14	Dover	42	11	17	14	41	46	0.891	39	
15	Tonbridge	42	12	15	15	38	45	0.844	39	
16	Romford	42	11	17	14	39	52	0.750	39	
17	Margate	42	15	8	19	56	63	0.889	38	
18	Guildford City	42	13	11	18	48	67	0.716	37	Merged into Guildford & Dorking United
19	Worcester City	42	11	14	17	53	67	0.791	36	Relegated to Division One North
20	Bedford Town	42	11	14	17	38	51	0.745	36	Relegated to Division One North
21	Folkestone	42	11	12	19	56	65	0.862	34	Relegated to Division One South
22	Hillingdon Borough	42	9	15	18	44	65	0.677	33	Relegated to Division One South

Source: fchd.com rsssf.com
Rules for classification: 1) points; 2) goal ratio.

== Division One North ==
Division One North consisted of 22 clubs, including 18 clubs from the previous season and four new clubs:

- Bletchley Town, transferred from Division One South
- Burton Albion, relegated from the Premier Division
- Dunstable Town, transferred from Division One South
- Witney Town, joined from the Hellenic Football League

Also, at the end of the previous season Lockheed Leamington was renamed AP Leamington.

At the end of the season Bletchley Town was renamed Milton Keynes City.

=== League table ===
Southern Football League Division One North
- Season: 1973–74
- Champions: Stourbridge
- Promoted: Burton Albion; Stourbridge
- Matches: 462
- Goals: 1,332 (2.88 per match)

Pos	Team	Pld	W	D	L	GF	GA	GR	Pts	Promotion or relegation
1	Stourbridge	42	29	11	2	103	36	2.861	69	Promoted to the Premier Division
2	Burton Albion	42	27	9	6	88	32	2.750	63	Promoted to the Premier Division
3	Cheltenham Town	42	24	8	10	75	51	1.471	56	
4	AP Leamington	42	21	12	9	82	45	1.822	54	
5	Enderby Town	42	19	14	9	60	36	1.667	52	
6	Witney Town	42	20	10	12	69	55	1.255	50	
7	Stevenage Athletic	42	19	11	12	65	46	1.413	49	
8	Banbury United	42	19	11	12	69	57	1.211	49	
9	King's Lynn	42	19	10	13	65	50	1.300	48	
10	Kidderminster Harriers	42	15	14	13	67	53	1.264	44	
11	Merthyr Tydfil	42	16	12	14	70	61	1.148	44	
12	Redditch United	42	14	11	17	56	73	0.767	39	
13	Bromsgrove Rovers	42	14	10	18	54	61	0.885	38	
14	Bedworth United	42	14	10	18	50	77	0.649	38	
15	Tamworth	42	13	11	18	42	51	0.824	37	
16	Corby Town	42	12	11	19	40	57	0.702	35	
17	Bletchley Town	42	10	15	17	47	71	0.662	35	
18	Barry Town	42	10	8	24	53	85	0.624	28	
19	Bury Town	42	10	6	26	57	84	0.679	26	
20	Gloucester City	42	10	6	26	52	81	0.642	26	
21	Wellingborough Town	42	7	9	26	42	87	0.483	23	
22	Dunstable Town	42	5	11	26	26	83	0.313	21	

Source: fchd.com rsssf.com
Rules for classification: 1) points; 2) goal ratio.

== Division One South ==
Division One North consisted of 20 clubs, including 17 clubs from the previous season and three new clubs, relegated from the Premier Division:

- Poole Town
- Ramsgate
- Waterlooville

=== League table ===
Southern Football League Division One South
- Season: 1973–74
- Champions: Wealdstone
- Promoted: Bath City; Wealdstone
- Matches: 380
- Goals: 996 (2.62 per match)

Pos	Team	Pld	W	D	L	GF	GA	GR	Pts	Promotion or relegation
1	Wealdstone	38	26	7	5	75	35	2.143	59	Promoted to the Premier Division
2	Bath City	38	20	8	10	55	34	1.618	48	Promoted to the Premier Division
3	Waterlooville	38	16	15	7	55	38	1.447	47	
4	Minehead	38	16	15	7	69	52	1.327	47	
5	Bideford	38	17	12	9	61	51	1.196	46	
6	Poole Town	38	18	9	11	67	47	1.426	45	
7	Bexley United	38	18	7	13	50	42	1.190	43	
8	Hastings United	38	16	9	13	45	36	1.250	41	
9	Basingstoke Town	38	14	11	13	55	44	1.250	39	
10	Gravesend & Northfleet	38	13	13	12	58	52	1.115	39	
11	Bognor Regis Town	38	13	12	13	48	54	0.889	38	
12	Ashford Town (Kent)	38	14	8	16	41	42	0.976	36	
13	Ramsgate	38	13	9	16	46	44	1.045	35	
14	Dorchester Town	38	10	13	15	40	48	0.833	33	
15	Canterbury City	38	9	12	17	37	46	0.804	30	
16	Trowbridge Town	38	8	14	16	44	61	0.721	30	
17	Salisbury	38	10	9	19	40	60	0.667	29	
18	Metropolitan Police	38	9	11	18	37	61	0.607	29	
19	Andover	38	11	3	24	38	70	0.543	25	
20	Crawley Town	38	6	9	23	35	79	0.443	21	

Source: fchd.com rsssf.com
Rules for classification: 1) points; 2) goal ratio.

== Football League elections ==
Alongside the four League clubs facing re-election, a total of seven non-League clubs applied for election, six of which were Southern League clubs. All the League clubs were re-elected.

Club	League	Votes
Doncaster Rovers	Football League	46
Stockport County	Football League	38
Crewe Alexandra	Football League	37
Workington	Football League	21
Kettering Town	Southern League	16
Yeovil Town	Southern League	14
Wigan Athletic	Northern Premier League	10
Chelmsford City	Southern League	8
Nuneaton Borough	Southern League	1
Telford United	Southern League	1
Cambridge City	Southern League	0

== See also ==
- Southern Football League
- 1973–74 Northern Premier League
