= Raymond Bailey (sportsman) =

English cricketer and footballer

Personal information
- Full name: Raymond Reginald Bailey
- Born: 16 May 1944 (age 82); Bedford, Bedfordshire, England
- Batting: Right-handed
- Bowling: Right-arm fast-medium
- Role: Occasional wicket-keeper

Domestic team information
- Years: Team
- 1963: Bedfordshire
- 1964–1973: Northamptonshire
- 1975–1979: Buckinghamshire
- 1978: Minor Counties West

Career statistics
Competition	First-class	List A
Matches	49	42
Runs scored	253	138
Batting average	9.37	7.26
100s/50s	0/0	0/0
Top score	25	13
Balls bowled	6,725	1,926
Wickets	108	41
Bowling average	26.90	26.07
5 wickets in innings	5	1
10 wickets in match	0	0
Best bowling	5/25	6/22
Catches/stumpings	27/–	10/–
- Source: Cricinfo, 23 June 2011
Association football career
- Position: Central defender
Youth career
- Bedford Town
Senior career*
Years	Team	Apps	(Gls)
1966–1971	Gillingham	160	(7)
1971	→ Northampton Town (loan)	1	(0)
1971–1973	Romford	69	(7)
- Hitchin Town
- Dunstable Town
Managerial career
- Milton Keynes City
- * Club domestic league appearances and goals

Raymond Reginald Bailey (born 16 May 1944) is an English former cricketer and footballer. He was born in Bedford, Bedfordshire, where he was educated and proved himself a sporting all rounder by captaining his school rugby team and playing in goal for the Bedfordshire Schools football team.

== Cricket ==
As a cricketer, Bailey was a right-handed batsman who bowled right-arm fast-medium and who could on occasion play as a wicket-keeper. He made his debut in county cricket for Bedfordshire against Staffordshire in the 1963 Minor Counties Championship. In 1964, he made his first-class debut for Northamptonshire in the 1964 County Championship against Kent. The following season, Bailey made his List A debut against Gloucestershire in the 1965 Gillette Cup. A capable bowler, Bailey played 48 first-class matches for Northamptonshire between 1964 and 1972. He took 105 wickets for Northamptonshire, which came at an average of 26.92, with him claiming 5 five wicket hauls and taking best figures of 5/25. Despite being a respectable performer with the ball, Bailey made infrequent appearances in first-class cricket for the county, making no more than 10 appearances in a season. His debut season was perhaps his most successful, with him taking 17 wickets in 6 matches at an average of 16.05, with 3 five wicket hauls. This season saw his best bowling figures, 5/25 against Hampshire. In his second season for Northamptonshire, Bailey was selected to play for the Marylebone Cricket Club against Yorkshire at Lord's, with him taking 3 wickets in the match.

The beginning of his career saw the introduction and onset of List A cricket. He began making regular appearances in this format for Northamptonshire in the 3rd season of the John Player League. He made a total of 38 appearances in limited-overs cricket for the county, with his last match coming against Sussex in the 1973 John Player League. He took 39 wickets for Northamptonshire in List A cricket, which came at an average of 24.43. It was for Northamptonshire that he took his only five wicket haul in List A cricket, taking 6/22 against Hampshire in the 1972 John Player League, a season in which he took 25 wickets at an average of 15.16, the only season in which he took more than 8 wickets. His 6/22 is the fourth best innings bowling figures for Northamptonshire in List A cricket. He left Northamptonshire at the end of the 1973 season.

He joined Buckinghamshire in 1975, making his debut for the county against Bedfordshire in the Minor Counties Championship. He played Minor counties cricket for Buckinghamshire from 1975 to 1980, making 46 Minor Counties Championship appearances. He made his first appearance for Buckinghamshire in a List A match in the 1975 Gillette Cup against Middlesex. Bailey would go on to make a further appearance against Suffolk in the 1979 Gillette Cup, while in between these matches he made 2 appearances for Minor Counties West against Gloucestershire and Warwickshire in the 1978 Benson & Hedges Cup. Even after he had stopped playing, Bailey still maintained a presence in cricket. He was head groundsman at the County Ground, Northampton for 10 years from 1986. Then the ground was used for both cricket and football, before football was moved to the Sixfields Stadium in 1994.

== Football ==
A midfielder, Bailey initially played for Bedford Town as an amateur before following then Bedford Town manager Basil Hayward to Gillingham, where Hayward had been appointed manager. He made his debut against Scunthorpe United in a 2–1 opening day victory in the 1966–67 season, with Bailey going on to play 52 times that season, including the 3 League Cup games against Arsenal. He scored his first goal in his 9th game of the season against Peterborough United, a match which ended in 2–2 draw. In August 1969, Bailey made club history by being the first Gillingham substitute to score, after he had come off the bench to replace Brian Yeo in an eventual 3–1 defeat by Luton Town. That season proved also to be his most successful with Gillingham, as he scored 7 goals, including a hat-trick in a 6–0 victory against Tamworth in the 2nd round of the FA Cup.

He was loaned out to Northampton Town the following season, playing just the one game, after which he left Gillingham at the end of that season. While at Gillingham, he had played 178 matches and scored 10 goals.

A move to Southern League side Romford followed in December 1971, before moves to Hitchin Town and Dunstable Town. Following the end of his playing career, Bailey had a spell in charge of Milton Keynes City.
