= 1975–76 Southern Football League =

The 1975–76 Southern Football League season was the 73rd in the history of the league, an English football competition.

Wimbledon won the championship, winning their second Southern League title in a row, whilst AP Leamington, Redditch United, Dartford and Minehead were all promoted to the Premier Division. Six Southern League clubs applied to join the Football League at the end of the season, but none were successful.

== Premier Division ==
The Premier Division consisted of 22 clubs, including 18 clubs from the previous season and four new clubs:

- Two clubs promoted from Division One North:
  - Bedford Town
  - Dunstable Town
- Two clubs promoted from Division One South:
  - Gravesend & Northfleet
  - Hillingdon Borough

Midway through the season Dunstable Town and Tonbridge folded, their records was transferred to the new clubs Dunstable and Tonbridge Angels respectively, with both clubs to be demoted to divisions One wherever they finish. Thus, Wealdstone was reprieved from relegation.

=== League table ===
Southern Football League Premier Division
- Season: 1975–76
- Champions: Wimbledon
- Relegated: Cambridge City; Stourbridge
- Matches: 462
- Goals: 1,181 (2.56 per match)

Pos	Team	Pld	W	D	L	GF	GA	GR	Pts	Promotion or relegation
1	Wimbledon	42	26	10	6	74	29	2.552	62	
2	Yeovil Town	42	21	12	9	68	35	1.943	54	
3	Atherstone Town	42	18	15	9	56	55	1.018	51	
4	Maidstone United	42	17	16	9	52	39	1.333	50	
5	Nuneaton Borough	42	16	18	8	41	33	1.242	50	
6	Gravesend & Northfleet	42	16	18	8	49	47	1.043	50	
7	Grantham	42	15	14	13	56	47	1.191	44	
8	Dunstable	42	17	9	16	55	43	1.279	43	Demoted to Division One North
9	Bedford Town	42	13	17	12	52	51	1.020	43	
10	Burton Albion	42	17	9	16	52	53	0.981	43	
11	Margate	42	15	12	15	62	60	1.033	42	
12	Hillingdon Borough	42	13	14	15	61	54	1.130	40	
13	Telford United	42	14	12	16	54	51	1.059	40	
14	Chelmsford City	42	13	14	15	52	57	0.912	40	
15	Kettering Town	42	11	17	14	48	52	0.923	39	
16	Bath City	42	11	16	15	62	57	1.088	38	
17	Weymouth	42	13	9	20	51	67	0.761	35	
18	Dover	42	8	18	16	51	60	0.850	34	
19	Wealdstone	42	12	9	21	61	82	0.744	33	Reprieved from relegation
20	Tonbridge Angels	42	11	11	20	45	70	0.643	33	Demoted to Division One South
21	Cambridge City	42	8	15	19	41	67	0.612	31	Relegated to Division One North
22	Stourbridge	42	10	9	23	38	72	0.528	29	Relegated to Division One North

Source: fchd.com rsssf.com
Rules for classification: 1) points; 2) goal ratio.

== Division One North ==
Division One North consisted of 22 clubs, including 20 clubs from the previous season and two new clubs:

- Barnet, relegated from the Premier Division
- Oswestry Town, joined from the Cheshire County League

=== League table ===
Southern Football League Division One North
- Season: 1975–76
- Champions: Redditch United
- Promoted: AP Leamington; Redditch United
- Matches: 462
- Goals: 1,316 (2.85 per match)

Pos	Team	Pld	W	D	L	GF	GA	GR	Pts	Promotion or relegation
1	Redditch United	42	29	11	2	101	39	2.590	69	Promoted to the Premier Division
2	AP Leamington	42	27	10	5	85	31	2.742	64	Promoted to the Premier Division
3	Witney Town	42	24	9	9	66	40	1.650	57	
4	Worcester City	42	24	8	10	90	49	1.837	56	
5	Cheltenham Town	42	20	10	12	87	55	1.582	50	
6	Barry Town	42	19	10	13	52	47	1.106	48	
7	King's Lynn	42	17	14	11	52	48	1.083	48	
8	Tamworth	42	18	11	13	65	43	1.512	47	
9	Barnet	42	15	12	15	56	57	0.982	42	Transferred to the Division One South
10	Oswestry Town	42	16	8	18	63	71	0.887	40	
11	Enderby Town	42	16	6	20	48	51	0.941	38	
12	Banbury United	42	15	8	19	58	67	0.866	38	
13	Merthyr Tydfil	42	11	15	16	59	67	0.881	37	
14	Bromsgrove Rovers	42	13	11	18	49	65	0.754	37	
15	Milton Keynes City	42	15	6	21	51	63	0.810	36	
16	Bury Town	42	12	11	19	52	72	0.722	35	Resigned to the Eastern Counties League
17	Gloucester City	42	13	9	20	49	78	0.628	35	
18	Kidderminster Harriers	42	13	8	21	54	70	0.771	34	
19	Bedworth United	42	8	18	16	41	65	0.631	34	
20	Corby Town	42	11	10	21	50	65	0.769	32	
21	Wellingborough Town	42	9	11	22	42	68	0.618	29	
22	Stevenage Athletic	42	6	6	30	46	105	0.438	18	Club folded

Source: fchd.com rsssf.com
Rules for classification: 1) points; 2) goal ratio.

== Division One South ==
Division One South consisted of 20 clubs, including 17 clubs from the previous season and three clubs, relegated from the Premier Division:

- Dartford
- Guildford & Dorking United
- Romford

=== League table ===
Southern Football League Division One South
- Season: 1975–76
- Champions: Minehead
- Promoted: Dartford; Minehead
- Matches: 380
- Goals: 1,169 (3.08 per match)

Pos	Team	Pld	W	D	L	GF	GA	GR	Pts	Promotion or relegation
1	Minehead	38	27	8	3	102	35	2.914	62	Promoted to the Premier Division
2	Dartford	38	26	4	8	84	46	1.826	56	Promoted to the Premier Division
3	Romford	38	21	9	8	66	37	1.784	51	
4	Salisbury	38	17	11	10	73	53	1.377	45	
5	Hastings United	38	15	15	8	67	51	1.314	45	
6	Poole Town	38	20	2	16	57	57	1.000	42	
7	Bexley United	38	14	13	11	62	53	1.170	41	Club folded
8	Waterlooville	38	13	13	12	62	54	1.148	39	
9	Basingstoke Town	38	13	12	13	69	71	0.972	38	
10	Ashford Town (Kent)	38	14	8	16	67	73	0.918	36	
11	Canterbury City	38	11	13	14	53	60	0.883	35	
12	Folkestone & Shepway	38	10	14	14	36	51	0.706	34	
13	Metropolitan Police	38	9	14	15	46	58	0.793	32	
14	Trowbridge Town	38	11	10	17	48	75	0.640	32	
15	Guildford & Dorking United	38	9	13	16	43	50	0.860	31	
16	Bognor Regis Town	38	6	17	15	44	72	0.611	29	
17	Ramsgate	38	9	10	19	57	76	0.750	28	Resigned to the Kent Football League
18	Crawley Town	38	9	10	19	46	66	0.697	28	
19	Andover	38	9	10	19	42	62	0.677	28	
20	Dorchester Town	38	11	6	21	45	69	0.652	28	

Source: fchd.com rsssf.com
Rules for classification: 1) points; 2) goal ratio.

== Football League elections ==
Alongside the four League clubs facing re-election, a total of nine non-League clubs applied for election, six of which were Southern League clubs. All the League clubs were re-elected.

Club	League	Votes
Stockport County	Football League	42
Newport County	Football League	41
Southport	Football League	38
Workington	Football League	21
Yeovil Town	Southern League	18
Kettering Town	Southern League	14
Wigan Athletic	Northern Premier League	6
Wimbledon	Southern League	3
Chelmsford City	Southern League	3
Nuneaton Borough	Southern League	2
Telford United	Southern League	2
Gainsborough Trinity	Northern Premier League	1
Scarborough	Northern Premier League	1

== See also ==
- Southern Football League
- 1975–76 Northern Premier League
