= Pat Ferry =

Scottish footballer (born 1947)

Personal information
- Date of birth: 3 February 1947 (age 79)
- Place of birth: Scotland
- Height: 6 ft 0 in (1.83 m)
- Position: Forward

Senior career*
Years	Team	Apps	(Gls)
- Shettleston
1969–1970	Morton	16	(2)
1970	Crystal Palace	0	(0)
1970–1972	Chelmsford City		
1972–1973	Margate		
1973	Tonbridge		
1973–1977	Romford	132	(26)
1977–1978	Wealdstone		
1978–1980	Bishop's Stortford		
1980–1981	Hertford Town		

Managerial career
- 1986–1987: Bishop's Stortford
- * Club domestic league appearances and goals

Pat Ferry (born 3 February 1947) is a Scottish former professional footballer who played as a forward.

== Playing career ==
Ferry began his career with Scottish junior club Shettleston. On 28 June 1969, he joined Scottish Division One side Morton. He played for the Greenock club for one season, making 16 league appearances, scoring twice.

Following his release by Morton in 1970, Ferry joined English club Crystal Palace. His involvement was limited to the reserves, scoring once in five appearances. In November 1970, he joined Chelmsford City. On his debut, he scored a hat-trick in an Eastern Professional Floodlight Competition tie against Stevenage Athletic. During the 1971–72 Southern League season, he scored nine goals in 18 appearances as Chelmsford won the league. In 1972, Ferry signed for Margate, making 32 appearances in all competitions, scoring eight goals.

In November 1973, after a short stint at Tonbridge, Ferry joined Romford. Over the course of four seasons there, he made 132 league appearances, scoring 26 times. Following his time at Romford, Ferry joined Wealdstone for a single season, before signing for Bishop's Stortford in 1978; he remained there for two seasons, then moved to Hertford Town for a single season in 1980.

== Managerial career ==
In 1986, Ferry was appointed manager of former club Bishop's Stortford, before being sacked in January 1987. During the 1991–92 season, he was named as assistant manager to Garry Hill at Heybridge Swifts.
