= 1972–73 Southern Football League =

The 1972–73 Southern Football League season was the 70th in the history of the league, an English football competition.

Kettering Town won the championship, winning their third Southern League title, whilst Atherstone Town, Grantham, Maidstone United and Tonbridge were all promoted to the Premier Division. Eight Southern League clubs applied to join the Football League at the end of the season, but none were successful.

== Premier Division ==
The Premier Division consisted of 22 clubs, including 18 clubs from the previous season and four new clubs:

- Two clubs promoted from Division One North:
  - Burton Albion
  - Kettering Town
- Two clubs promoted from Division One South:
  - Ramsgate Athletic, who were renamed Ramsgate at the end of the previous season
  - Waterlooville

=== League table ===
Southern Football League Premier Division
- Season: 1972–73
- Champions: Kettering Town
- Relegated: Burton Albion; Poole Town; Ramsgate; Waterlooville
- Matches: 462
- Goals: 1,236 (2.68 per match)

Pos	Team	Pld	W	D	L	GF	GA	GR	Pts	Promotion or relegation
1	Kettering Town	42	20	17	5	74	44	1.682	57	
2	Yeovil Town	42	21	14	7	67	31	2.161	56	
3	Dover	42	23	9	10	61	38	1.605	55	
4	Chelmsford City	42	23	7	12	75	43	1.744	53	
5	Worcester City	42	20	13	9	68	47	1.447	53	
6	Weymouth	42	20	12	10	72	51	1.412	52	
7	Margate	42	17	15	10	80	60	1.333	49	
8	Bedford Town	42	16	15	11	43	36	1.194	47	
9	Nuneaton Borough	42	16	14	12	51	41	1.244	46	
10	Telford United	42	12	20	10	57	47	1.213	44	
11	Cambridge City	42	14	15	13	64	53	1.208	43	
12	Wimbledon	42	14	14	14	50	50	1.000	42	
13	Barnet	42	15	11	16	60	59	1.017	41	
14	Romford	42	17	5	20	51	65	0.785	39	
15	Hillingdon Borough	42	16	6	20	53	59	0.898	38	
16	Dartford	42	12	11	19	49	63	0.778	35	
17	Folkestone	42	11	11	20	41	72	0.569	33	
18	Guildford City	42	10	11	21	59	84	0.702	31	
19	Ramsgate	42	9	13	20	35	61	0.574	31	Relegated to Division One South
20	Poole Town	42	10	10	22	50	88	0.568	30	Relegated to Division One South
21	Burton Albion	42	9	7	26	43	81	0.531	25	Relegated to Division One North
22	Waterlooville	42	4	16	22	33	63	0.524	24	Relegated to Division One South

Source: fchd.com rsssf.com
Rules for classification: 1) points; 2) goal ratio.

== Division One North ==
Division One North consisted of 22 clubs, including 13 clubs from the previous season and nine new clubs:

- Six clubs joined from the West Midlands (Regional) League:
  - Atherstone Town
  - Bedworth United
  - Bromsgrove Rovers
  - Kidderminster Harriers
  - Redditch United
  - Tamworth
- Plus:
  - Enderby Town, joined from the Leicestershire Senior League
  - Grantham, joined from the Midland League
  - Merthyr Tydfil, relegated from the Premier Division

At the end of the season Lockheed Leamington was renamed AP Leamington.

=== League table ===
Southern Football League Division One North
- Season: 1972–73
- Champions: Grantham
- Promoted: Atherstone Town; Grantham
- Matches: 462
- Goals: 1,298 (2.81 per match)

Pos	Team	Pld	W	D	L	GF	GA	GR	Pts	Promotion or relegation
1	Grantham	42	29	8	5	113	41	2.756	66	Promoted to the Premier Division
2	Atherstone Town	42	23	11	8	82	48	1.708	57	Promoted to the Premier Division
3	Cheltenham Town	42	24	8	10	87	47	1.851	56	
4	Rugby Town	42	20	10	12	60	47	1.277	50	Resigned from the league
5	Kidderminster Harriers	42	19	12	11	67	56	1.196	50	
6	Merthyr Tydfil	42	17	12	13	51	40	1.275	46	
7	Corby Town	42	14	16	12	62	56	1.107	44	
8	Stourbridge	42	16	11	15	70	64	1.094	43	
9	Gloucester City	42	18	7	17	55	64	0.859	43	
10	Bromsgrove Rovers	42	17	8	17	63	54	1.167	42	
11	Redditch United	42	18	6	18	58	59	0.983	42	
12	Banbury United	42	18	5	19	60	53	1.132	41	
13	Wellingborough Town	42	17	7	18	58	71	0.817	41	
14	King's Lynn	42	14	12	16	48	49	0.980	40	
15	Lockheed Leamington	42	13	12	17	51	58	0.879	38	
16	Enderby Town	42	12	14	16	50	61	0.820	38	
17	Stevenage Athletic	42	12	13	17	50	63	0.794	37	
18	Tamworth	42	14	8	20	45	65	0.692	36	
19	Bury Town	42	13	9	20	52	69	0.754	35	
20	Barry Town	42	11	10	21	39	71	0.549	32	
21	Ilkeston Town	42	9	6	27	35	68	0.515	24	Resigned to the Midland League
22	Bedworth United	42	10	3	29	42	94	0.447	23	

Source: fchd.com rsssf.com
Rules for classification: 1) points; 2) goal ratio.

== Division One South ==
Division One South consisted of 22 clubs, including 13 clubs from the previous season and nine new clubs:

- Two clubs relegated from the Premier Division:
  - Bath City
  - Gravesend & Northfleet
- Three clubs transferred from Division One North:
  - Bletchley Town
  - Dunstable Town
  - Wealdstone
- Three clubs joined from the Western League
  - Bideford
  - Dorchester Town
  - Minehead
- Plus:
  - Bognor Regis Town, joined from the Sussex County League

=== League table ===
Southern Football League Division One South
- Season: 1972–73
- Champions: Maidstone United
- Promoted: Maidstone United; Tonbridge
- Matches: 462
- Goals: 1,347 (2.92 per match)

Pos	Team	Pld	W	D	L	GF	GA	GR	Pts	Promotion or relegation
1	Maidstone United	42	25	12	5	90	38	2.368	62	Promoted to the Premier Division
2	Tonbridge	42	26	7	9	70	44	1.591	59	Promoted to the Premier Division
3	Ashford Town (Kent)	42	24	7	11	90	40	2.250	55	
4	Bideford	42	19	14	9	70	43	1.628	52	
5	Minehead	42	20	12	10	65	47	1.383	52	
6	Gravesend & Northfleet	42	22	7	13	81	55	1.473	51	
7	Bath City	42	18	11	13	56	54	1.037	47	
8	Wealdstone	42	16	12	14	81	61	1.328	44	
9	Bletchley Town	42	14	13	15	54	51	1.059	41	Transferred to Division One North
10	Hastings United	42	14	13	15	53	53	1.000	41	
11	Andover	42	15	11	16	62	70	0.886	41	
12	Canterbury City	42	14	12	16	51	59	0.864	40	
13	Basingstoke Town	42	14	12	16	48	57	0.842	40	
14	Crawley Town	42	14	11	17	59	76	0.776	39	
15	Metropolitan Police	42	15	8	19	82	75	1.093	38	
16	Bexley United	42	12	14	16	54	64	0.844	38	
17	Trowbridge Town	42	15	8	19	65	77	0.844	38	
18	Salisbury	42	14	10	18	49	60	0.817	38	
19	Bognor Regis Town	42	12	9	21	41	66	0.621	33	
20	Dorchester Town	42	10	12	20	47	73	0.644	32	
21	Winchester City	42	7	11	24	41	79	0.519	25	Resigned to the Hampshire League
22	Dunstable Town	42	4	10	28	38	105	0.362	18	Transferred to Division One North

Source: fchd.com rsssf.com
Rules for classification: 1) points; 2) goal ratio.

== Football League elections ==
Alongside the four League clubs facing re-election, a total of 10 non-League clubs applied for election, eight of which were Southern League clubs. All the League clubs were re-elected.

Club	League	Votes
Colchester United	Football League	48
Northampton Town	Football League	43
Crewe Alexandra	Football League	36
Darlington	Football League	26
Yeovil Town	Southern League	14
Kettering Town	Southern League	12
Wigan Athletic	Northern Premier League	10
Chelmsford City	Southern League	4
Cambridge City	Southern League	1
Nuneaton Borough	Southern League	1
Telford United	Southern League	1
Bedford Town	Southern League	0
Boston United	Northern Premier League	0
Wimbledon	Southern League	0

== See also ==
- Southern Football League
- 1972–73 Northern Premier League
