= 1983–84 FA Trophy =

FA Challenge Trophy

Tournament details
- Country: England; Wales
- Teams: 212

Final positions
- Champions: Northwich Victoria
- Runners-up: Bangor City

The 1983–84 FA Trophy was the fifteenth season of the FA Trophy. The final was held at Wembley Stadium, with a replay being played at Stoke City's Victoria Ground.

== Preliminary round ==
=== Ties ===
Tie	Home team	Score	Away team
1	Accrington Stanley	0–1	Bootle
2	Alfreton Town	3–0	Eastwood Town
3	Banbury United	1–1	St Albans City
4	Boreham Wood	3–0	Hertford Town
5	Cheshunt	0–4	Farnborough Town
6	Cinderford Town	2–0	Bridport
7	Congleton Town	3–4	Radcliffe Borough
8	Curzon Ashton	2–0	West Auckland Town
9	Dover Athletic	2–2	Thanet United
10	Epsom & Ewell	5–0	Hornchurch
11	Heanor Town	1–2	Willenhall Town
12	Highgate United	0–2	Lye Town
13	Hillingdon Borough	2–1	Feltham
14	Milton Keynes City	0–3	Cambridge City
15	Prescot Cables	0–2	Formby
16	Sheppey United	3–3	Walton & Hersham
17	Sittingbourne	2–3	Ashford Town (Kent)
18	Sudbury Town	1–1	Spalding United
19	Taunton Town	0–1	Basingstoke Town
20	Weston-super-Mare	2–2	Forest Green Rovers

=== Replays ===
Tie	Home team	Score	Away team
3	St Albans City	1–2	Banbury United
9	Thanet United	4–3	Dover Athletic
16	Walton & Hersham	1–0	Sheppey United
18	Spalding United	2–1	Sudbury Town
20	Forest Green Rovers	0–1	Weston super Mare

== First qualifying round ==
=== Ties ===
Tie	Home team	Score	Away team
1	Addlestone & Weybridge	0–2	Crawley Town
2	Alfreton Town	3–1	Willenhall Town
3	Ashford Town (Kent)	0–2	Fareham Town
4	Ashton United	0–0	Netherfield
5	Aveley	0–3	Chelmsford City
6	Barnstaple Town	0–3	Frome Town
7	Basingstoke Town	1–1	Canterbury City
8	Bideford	2–1	Bridgwater Town
9	Billericay Town	1–0	Wellingborough Town
10	Bognor Regis Town	1–1	Waterlooville
11	Boston	0–3	Bedworth United
12	Bridlington Trinity	2–2	Southport
13	Burscough	3–3	Goole Town
14	Buxton	1–1	Belper Town
15	Caernarfon Town	1–0	Colwyn Bay
16	Chatham Town	1–2	Andover
17	Chesham United	1–1	Wembley
18	Cinderford Town	1–1	Bridgend Town
19	Consett	4–2	Billingham Synthonia
20	Crook Town	1–1	Tow Law Town
21	Curzon Ashton	0–0	Workington
22	Dawlish Town	6–0	Clandown
23	Dudley Town	1–2	Grantham
24	Dunstable	1–5	Clapton
25	Durham City	3–1	Mexborough Town Athletic
26	Evenwood Town	1–1	Shildon
27	Farnborough Town	2–2	Walton & Hersham
28	Fisher Athletic	4–0	Hounslow
29	Folkestone	0–0	Epsom & Ewell
30	Gainsborough Trinity	1–1	Matlock Town
31	Glossop	1–2	Oswestry Town
32	Gravesend & Northfleet	1–1	Matlock Town
33	Hampton	2–0	Kingstonian
34	Hayes	6–1	Cambridge City
35	Hednesford Town	0–2	Rhyl
36	Hillingdon Borough	1–2	Windsor & Eton
37	Hyde United	4–0	Formby
38	Keynsham Town	0–1	Minehead
39	Leek Town	0–2	South Liverpool
40	Leicester United	1–0	Bilston
41	Lewes	2–3	Bromley
42	Lowestoft Town	1–4	Boreham Wood
43	Lye Town	1–4	Bromsgrove Rovers
44	Macclesfield Town	0–1	Horwich R M I
45	Maesteg Park	1–1	Salisbury
46	Maidenhead United	1–0	King's Lynn
47	Melksham Town	1–1	Weston super Mare
48	Moor Green	1–1	Redditch United
49	Morecambe	2–1	Ferryhill Athletic
50	North Shields	6–1	Willington
51	Oldbury United	0–3	Arnold
52	Penrith	0–2	South Bank
53	Shepton Mallet Town	1–2	Poole Town
54	Spalding United	0–1	Wokingham Town
55	Staines Town	0–0	Leatherhead
56	Stourbridge	1–2	Sutton Town
57	Sutton Coldfield Town	1–0	Witney Town
58	Tamworth	3–1	Nantwich Town
59	Thanet United	0–1	Metropolitan Police
60	Tonbridge	2–3	Worthing
61	Walthamstow Avenue	0–0	Oxford City
62	Whitley Bay	1–2	Radcliffe Borough
63	Winsford United	1–1	Bootle
64	Worksop Town	2–1	Emley

=== Replays ===
Tie	Home team	Score	Away team
4	Netherfield	2–1	Ashton United
7	Canterbury City	0–2	Basingstoke Town
10	Waterlooville	0–3	Bognor Regis Town
12	Southport	2–0	Bridlington Trinity
13	Goole Town	4–2	Burscough
14	Belper Town	2–2	Buxton
17	Wembley	4–0	Chesham United
18	Bridgend Town	2–0	Cinderford Town
20	Tow Law Town	0–1	Crook Town
21	Workington	2–0	Curzon Ashton
26	Shildon	1–0	Evenwood Town
27	Walton & Hersham	1–0	Farnborough Town
29	Epsom & Ewell	0–1	Folkestone
30	Matlock Town	1–0	Gainsborough Trinity
45	Salisbury	3–0	Maesteg Park
47	Weston super Mare	3–2	Melksham Town
48	Redditch United	2–0	Moor Green
55	Leatherhead	4–1	Staines Town
61	Oxford City	1–2	Walthamstow Avenue
63	Bootle	0–1	Winsford United

=== 2nd replay ===
Tie	Home team	Score	Away team
14	Belper Town	1–0	Buxton

== Second qualifying round ==
=== Ties ===
Tie	Home team	Score	Away team
1	Alfreton Town	2–0	Bedworth United
2	Arnold	2–0	Oswestry Town
3	Bognor Regis Town	1–3	Fisher Athletic
4	Boreham Wood	1–1	Bromley
5	Bridgend Town	2–3	Poole Town
6	Bromsgrove Rovers	1–0	Redditch United
7	Chelmsford City	3–0	Clapton
8	Consett	1–1	South Liverpool
9	Crook Town	4–1	Netherfield
10	Dawlish Town	0–1	Frome Town
11	Durham City	1–0	Goole Town
12	Grantham	0–0	Leicester United
13	Gravesend & Northfleet	2–2	Worthing
14	Hampton	2–1	Basingstoke Town
15	Hayes	2–1	Folkestone
16	Horwich R M I	4–1	Winsford United
17	Hyde United	2–1	Caernarfon Town
18	Leatherhead	2–0	Andover
19	Maidenhead United	1–1	Fareham Town
20	Matlock Town	4–0	Sutton Coldfield Town
21	Metropolitan Police	1–1	Wembley
22	Minehead	1–1	Bideford
23	North Shields	1–1	Morecambe
24	Radcliffe Borough	2–2	Worksop Town
25	Rhyl	5–0	Tamworth
26	Salisbury	4–2	Weston super Mare
27	South Bank	3–1	Shildon
28	Sutton Town	2–1	Belper Town
29	Walthamstow Avenue	1–1	Crawley Town
30	Walton & Hersham	2–0	Billericay Town
31	Wokingham Town	2–2	Windsor & Eton
32	Workington	0–0	Southport

=== Replays ===
Tie	Home team	Score	Away team
4	Bromley	3–1	Boreham Wood
8	South Liverpool	2–0	Consett
12	Leicester United	0–1	Grantham
13	Worthing	2–0	Gravesend & Northfleet
19	Fareham Town	3–0	Maidenhead United
21	Wembley	2–1	Metropolitan Police
22	Bideford	2–3	Minehead
23	Morecambe	4–4	North Shields
24	Worksop Town	2–1	Radcliffe Borough
29	Crawley Town	0–0	Walthamstow Avenue
31	Windsor & Eton	3–2	Wokingham Town
32	Southport	0–1	Workington

=== 2nd replays ===
Tie	Home team	Score	Away team
23	North Shields	4–1	Morecambe
29	Walthamstow Avenue	1–3	Crawley Town

== Third qualifying round ==
=== Ties ===
Tie	Home team	Score	Away team
1	Alfreton Town	1–1	Sutton Town
2	Alvechurch	2–2	Matlock Town
3	Arnold	1–0	Burton Albion
4	Barking	5–0	Tilbury
5	Bromley	1–3	Aylesbury United
6	Bromsgrove Rovers	2–2	Stafford Rangers
7	Carshalton Athletic	1–0	Hitchin Town
8	Crawley Town	0–2	Chelmsford City
9	Dorchester Town	1–1	Minehead
10	Dulwich Hamlet	4–3	Kettering Town
11	Durham City	3–0	Lancaster City
12	Frickley Athletic	1–0	Worksop Town
13	Frome Town	0–1	Merthyr Tydfil
14	Hampton	1–1	Wembley
15	Harlow Town	0–7	Fareham Town
16	Hastings United	3–1	Worthing
17	Hayes	1–3	Barnet
18	Hendon	2–0	Woking
19	Horden Colliery Welfare	4–1	Crook Town
20	Horwich R M I	0–1	Marine
21	Hyde United	0–4	Grantham
22	Ilkeston Town	0–5	Witton Albion
23	Leatherhead	2–3	Windsor & Eton
24	North Shields	3–1	Workington
25	Rhyl	3–0	Stalybridge Celtic
26	Salisbury	2–2	Gloucester City
27	South Liverpool	4–2	South Bank
28	Spennymoor United	2–1	Ashington
29	Trowbridge Town	6–2	Poole Town
30	Walton & Hersham	1–3	Fisher Athletic
31	Welling United	0–0	Tooting & Mitcham United
32	Yeovil Town	5–2	Cheltenham Town

=== Replays ===
Tie	Home team	Score	Away team
1	Sutton Town	2–1	Alfreton Town
2	Matlock Town	4–2	Alvechurch
6	Stafford Rangers	1–1	Bromsgrove Rovers
9	Minehead	1–3	Dorchester Town
14	Wembley	0–2	Hampton
26	Gloucester City	3–3	Salisbury
31	Tooting & Mitcham United	1–2	Welling United

=== 2nd replays ===
Tie	Home team	Score	Away team
6	Bromsgrove Rovers	2–0	Stafford Rangers
26	Gloucester City	2–0	Salisbury

== 1st round ==
The teams that given byes to this round are Telford United, Enfield, Maidstone United, Wealdstone, Runcorn, Boston United, Weymouth, Northwich Victoria, Scarborough, Bath City, Nuneaton Borough, Altrincham, Bangor City, Dagenham, Worcester City, Kidderminster Harriers, Gateshead, Barrow, Dartford, Bishop's Stortford, Wycombe Wanderers, Blyth Spartans, Mossley, Sutton United, Slough Town, Leytonstone Ilford, Bishop Auckland, A P Leamington, Chorley, Harrow Borough, Croydon and Whitby Town.

=== Ties ===
Tie	Home team	Score	Away team
1	Altrincham	0–2	Kidderminster Harriers
2	Arnold	0–1	Barrow
3	Bangor City	3–1	Spennymoor United
4	Barking	0–1	Aylesbury United
5	Barnet	3–0	Dartford
6	Bishop Auckland	1–1	Grantham
7	Boston United	1–1	Northwich Victoria
8	Bromsgrove Rovers	2–1	South Liverpool
9	Carshalton Athletic	2–2	Harrow Borough
10	Chorley	2–1	Rhyl
11	Croydon	0–0	Bath City
12	Dagenham	0–0	Fareham Town
13	Durham City	1–3	North Shields
14	Gateshead	1–1	Horden Colliery Welfare
15	Gloucester City	3–3	Fisher Athletic
16	Hampton	0–2	Maidstone United
17	Leytonstone Ilford	0–0	Trowbridge Town
18	Marine	2–1	Scarborough
19	Merthyr Tydfil	2–0	Enfield
20	Mossley	1–2	Telford United
21	Runcorn	1–0	Matlock Town
22	Slough Town	3–4	Dulwich Hamlet
23	Sutton Town	1–4	Frickley Athletic
24	Sutton United	0–3	Chelmsford City
25	Welling United	2–1	Hastings United
26	Weymouth	2–3	Hendon
27	Whitby Town	1–1	Blyth Spartans
28	Windsor & Eton	2–1	Bishop's Stortford
29	Witton Albion	3–4	A P Leamington
30	Worcester City	0–0	Nuneaton Borough
31	Wycombe Wanderers	4–0	Dorchester Town
32	Yeovil Town	4–3	Wealdstone

=== Replays ===
Tie	Home team	Score	Away team
6	Grantham	1–0	Bishop Auckland
7	Northwich Victoria	5–1	Boston United
9	Harrow Borough	0–2	Carshalton Athletic
11	Bath City	6–0	Croydon
12	Fareham Town	2–3	Dagenham
14	Horden Colliery Welfare	1–3	Gateshead
15	Fisher Athletic	4–3	Gloucester City
17	Trowbridge Town	1–2	Leytonstone Ilford
27	Blyth Spartans	1–2	Whitby Town
30	Nuneaton Borough	2–0	Worcester City

== 2nd round ==
=== Ties ===
Tie	Home team	Score	Away team
1	A P Leamington	4–1	Welling United
2	Aylesbury United	0–1	Northwich Victoria
3	Bangor City	1–0	Bath City
4	Barnet	4–1	North Shields
5	Bromsgrove Rovers	2–0	Wycombe Wanderers
6	Carshalton Athletic	1–2	Gateshead
7	Chelmsford City	2–1	Hendon
8	Dagenham	1–1	Yeovil Town
9	Dulwich Hamlet	1–1	Chorley
10	Frickley Athletic	5–2	Barrow
11	Grantham	0–3	Marine
12	Leytonstone Ilford	0–1	Whitby Town
13	Maidstone United	2–2	Nuneaton Borough
14	Merthyr Tydfil	0–1	Kidderminster Harriers
15	Telford United	2–1	Runcorn
16	Windsor & Eton	1–1	Fisher Athletic

=== Replays ===
Tie	Home team	Score	Away team
8	Yeovil Town	1–4	Dagenham
9	Chorley	2–2	Dulwich Hamlet
13	Nuneaton Borough	1–0	Maidstone United
16	Fisher Athletic	4–0	Windsor & Eton

=== 2nd replay ===
Tie	Home team	Score	Away team
9	Dulwich Hamlet	2–0	Chorley

== 3rd round ==
=== Ties ===
Tie	Home team	Score	Away team
1	A P Leamington	4–0	Chelmsford City
2	Barnet	2–1	Kidderminster Harriers
3	Dulwich Hamlet	0–0	Northwich Victoria
4	Fisher Athletic	0–1	Marine
5	Gateshead	2–2	Bangor City
6	Nuneaton Borough	2–2	Dagenham
7	Telford United	2–0	Bromsgrove Rovers
8	Whitby Town	2–0	Frickley Athletic

=== Replays ===
Tie	Home team	Score	Away team
3	Northwich Victoria	0–0	Dulwich Hamlet
5	Bangor City	2–0	Gateshead
6	Dagenham	1–0	Nuneaton Borough

=== 2nd replay ===
Tie	Home team	Score	Away team
3	Northwich Victoria	1–0	Dulwich Hamlet

== 4th round ==
=== Ties ===
Tie	Home team	Score	Away team
1	A P Leamington	1–6	Bangor City
2	Dagenham	2–2	Whitby Town
3	Northwich Victoria	1–0	Barnet
4	Telford United	3–3	Marine

=== Replays ===
Tie	Home team	Score	Away team
2	Whitby Town	0–3	Dagenham
4	Marine	2–0	Telford United

== Semi finals ==
=== First leg ===
Tie	Home team	Score	Away team
1	Bangor City	1–0	Dagenham
2	Northwich Victoria	1–1	Marine

=== Second leg ===
Tie	Home team	Score	Away team	Aggregate
1	Dagenham	2–2	Bangor City	2–3
2	Marine	0–2	Northwich Victoria	1–3

== Final ==
=== Tie ===
Home team	Score	Away team
Northwich Victoria	1–1	Bangor City

=== Replay ===
Home team	Score	Away team
Northwich Victoria	2–1	Bangor City
