= 1983–84 FA Cup =

Tournament details
- Country: England; Wales

Final positions
- Champions: Everton (4th title)
- Runners-up: Watford

Tournament statistics
- Top goal scorer(s): Mo Johnston; John Barnes (4 goals)

The 1983–84 FA Cup was the 103rd season of the world's oldest football knockout competition, the Football Association Challenge Cup, or FA Cup. The competition was won by Everton, who defeated first-time finalists Watford 2–0 at Wembley.

== Qualifying rounds ==
Most participating clubs that were not members of the Football League competed in the qualifying rounds to secure one of 28 places available in the first round.

The winners from the fourth qualifying round were Frickley Athletic, Macclesfield Town, Whitby Town, Penrith, Bangor City, Mossley, Hyde United, AP Leamington, Kettering Town, Burton Albion, Gainsborough Trinity, Boston United, Chelmsford City, Wycombe Wanderers, Harrow Borough, Wealdstone, Dagenham, Barnet, Dartford, Barking, Maidstone United, Farnborough Town, Windsor & Eton, Yeovil Town, Worcester City, Poole Town, Waterlooville and Corinthian-Casuals.

Harrow Borough was the only qualifying club appearing in the competition proper for the first time. Of the others, Chelmsford City had last featured at this stage in 1974–75, Frickley Athletic had last done so in 1973–74, Bangor City had last done so in 1972–73, Whitby Town had not advanced from the qualifying rounds since 1969–70, Gainsborough Trinity and Poole Town since 1966–67, Corinthian-Casuals since 1965–66 and Hyde United since 1954–55.

== First round proper ==
The 48 teams from the Football League Third and Fourth Divisions entered this round along with the 28 non-league clubs from the qualifying rounds and Telford United, Northwich Victoria, Enfield and Altrincham who were given byes. The round included three clubs from the various competitions at Step 8 of English football who were the lowest-ranked teams in the draw: Penrith, Whitby Town and Corinthian-Casuals.

The first round matches were played over the weekend of 19–20 November 1983. Replays were played on 21–23 November, or 28 November.

Tie no	Home team	Score	Away team	Date
1	Chester City	1–2	Chesterfield	19 November 1983
2	Darlington	5–0	Mossley (6)	19 November 1983
3	AFC Bournemouth	4–0	Walsall	19 November 1983
4	Barking (6)	2–1	Farnborough Town (7)	19 November 1983
5	Barnet (5)	0–0	Bristol Rovers	19 November 1983
Replay	Bristol Rovers	3–1	Barnet	22 November 1983
6	Burnley	2–0	Hyde United (6)	19 November 1983
7	Poole Town (7)	0–0	Newport County	20 November 1983
Replay	Newport County	3–1	Poole Town	22 November 1983
8	Rochdale	1–0	Crewe Alexandra	19 November 1983
9	Yeovil Town (5)	0–1	Harrow Borough (6)	19 November 1983
10	Reading	2–0	Hereford United	19 November 1983
11	Northwich Victoria (5)	1–1	Bangor City (5)	19 November 1983
Replay	Bangor City	1–0	Northwich Victoria	22 November 1983
12	Macclesfield Town (6)	0–0	York City	19 November 1983
Replay	York City	2–0	Macclesfield Town	22 November 1983
13	Gainsborough Trinity (6)	0–2	Blackpool	19 November 1983
14	Wrexham	1–5	Sheffield United	19 November 1983
15	Tranmere Rovers	2–2	Bolton Wanderers	19 November 1983
Replay	Bolton Wanderers	4–1	Tranmere Rovers	22 November 1983
16	Northampton Town	1–1	Waterlooville (7)	19 November 1983
Replay	Waterlooville	1–1	Northampton Town	23 November 1983
Replay	Northampton Town	2–0	Waterlooville	28 November 1983
17	Bradford City	0–0	Wigan Athletic	19 November 1983
Replay	Wigan Athletic	4–2	Bradford City	28 November 1983
18	Millwall	2–1	Dartford (6)	19 November 1983
19	Wimbledon	2–1	Orient	19 November 1983
20	Penrith (8)	0–2	Hull City	19 November 1983
21	Southend United	0–0	Plymouth Argyle	19 November 1983
Replay	Plymouth Argyle	2–0	Southend United	22 November 1983
22	Exeter City	1–1	Maidstone United (5)	19 November 1983
Replay	Maidstone United	2–1	Exeter City	23 November 1983
23	Scunthorpe United	1–0	Preston North End	19 November 1983
24	Mansfield Town	3–0	Doncaster Rovers	19 November 1983
25	Port Vale	1–2	Lincoln City	19 November 1983
26	Halifax Town	2–3	Whitby Town (8)	19 November 1983
27	Wealdstone (5)	1–1	Enfield (5)	19 November 1983
Replay	Enfield	2–2	Wealdstone	22 November 1983
Replay	Wealdstone	2–0	Enfield	28 November 1983
28	Torquay United	1–2	Colchester United	19 November 1983
29	Kettering Town (5)	0–7	Swindon Town	19 November 1983
30	Rotherham United	0–0	Hartlepool United	19 November 1983
Replay	Hartlepool United	0–1	Rotherham United	23 November 1983
31	Aldershot	1–1	Worcester City (5)	19 November 1983
Replay	Worcester City	2–1	Aldershot	21 November 1983
32	Boston United (5)	0–3	Bury	19 November 1983
33	Chelmsford City (6)	0–0	Wycombe Wanderers (6)	19 November 1983
Replay	Wycombe Wanderers	1–2	Chelmsford City	22 November 1983
34	Burton Albion (6)	1–2	Windsor & Eton (7)	19 November 1983
35	Dagenham (5)	2–2	Brentford	19 November 1983
Replay	Brentford	2–1	Dagenham	22 November 1983
36	Oxford United	2–0	Peterborough United	19 November 1983
37	Corinthian-Casuals (8)	0–0	Bristol City	19 November 1983
Replay	Bristol City	4–0	Corinthian-Casuals	23 November 1983
38	Telford United (5)	3–0	Stockport County	19 November 1983
39	AP Leamington (6)	0–1	Gillingham	19 November 1983
40	Frickley Athletic (5)	0–1	Altrincham (5)	19 November 1983

== Second round proper ==
The second round matches were played mainly on 10 December 1983, with a couple of ties and replays being played on 13–14 December, or 19 December. Whitby Town, from the Northern League (Step 8) was the lowest-ranked team in the round.

Tie no	Home team	Score	Away team	Date
1	Chesterfield	2–2	Burnley	10 December 1983
Replay	Burnley	3–2	Chesterfield	19 December 1983
2	Darlington	0–0	Altrincham (5)	10 December 1983
Replay	Altrincham	0–2	Darlington	14 December 1983
3	Reading	1–1	Oxford United	10 December 1983
Replay	Oxford United	3–0	Reading	14 December 1983
4	Gillingham	6–1	Chelmsford City (6)	10 December 1983
5	Bolton Wanderers	2–0	Mansfield Town	10 December 1983
6	Lincoln City	0–0	Sheffield United	10 December 1983
Replay	Sheffield United	1–0	Lincoln City	19 December 1983
7	Windsor & Eton (7)	0–0	AFC Bournemouth	13 December 1983
Replay	AFC Bournemouth	2–0	Windsor & Eton	19 December 1983
8	Bangor City (5)	1–1	Blackpool	10 December 1983
Replay	Blackpool	2–1	Bangor City	13 December 1983
9	Brentford	3–2	Wimbledon	10 December 1983
10	Bristol Rovers	1–2	Bristol City	10 December 1983
11	Maidstone United (5)	3–2	Worcester City (5)	10 December 1983
12	Northampton Town	1–1	Telford United (5)	10 December 1983
Replay	Telford United	3–2	Northampton Town	14 December 1983
13	Plymouth Argyle	2–1	Barking (6)	10 December 1983
14	Millwall	2–3	Swindon Town	10 December 1983
15	Scunthorpe United	2–0	Bury	10 December 1983
16	York City	0–2	Rochdale	13 December 1983
17	Rotherham United	2–1	Hull City	10 December 1983
18	Wigan Athletic	1–0	Whitby Town (8)	10 December 1983
19	Colchester United	4–0	Wealdstone (5)	10 December 1983
20	Harrow Borough (6)	1–3	Newport County	10 December 1983

== Third round proper ==
Teams from the Football League First and Second Divisions entered in this round. The third round matches were played over the weekend 6–8 January 1984. Replays took place on 10–11 January, with second replays on 16 January. Holders Manchester United were eliminated by third-tier AFC Bournemouth. Maidstone United and Telford United, from the Alliance Premier League (Step 5) were the lowest-ranked teams in the round.

Tie no	Home team	Score	Away team	Date
1	Blackpool (4)	2–1	Manchester City (2)	7 January 1984
2	Darlington (4)	4–1	Maidstone United (5)	7 January 1984
3	AFC Bournemouth (3)	2–0	Manchester United (1)	7 January 1984
4	Burnley (3)	0–0	Oxford United (3)	7 January 1984
Replay	Oxford United	2–1	Burnley	11 January 1984
5	Liverpool (1)	4–0	Newcastle United (2)	6 January 1984
6	Rochdale (4)	1–4	Telford United (5)	7 January 1984
7	Gillingham (3)	5–3	Brentford (3)	7 January 1984
8	Notts County (1)	2–2	Bristol City (4)	8 January 1984
Replay	Bristol City	0–2	Notts County	10 January 1984
9	Nottingham Forest (1)	1–2	Southampton (1)	7 January 1984
10	Blackburn Rovers (2)	1–0	Chelsea (2)	7 January 1984
11	Aston Villa (1)	1–1	Norwich City (1)	7 January 1984
Replay	Norwich City	3–0	Aston Villa	11 January 1984
12	Sheffield Wednesday (2)	1–0	Barnsley (2)	7 January 1984
13	Bolton Wanderers (3)	0–3	Sunderland (1)	7 January 1984
14	Middlesbrough (2)	3–2	Arsenal (1)	7 January 1984
15	Luton Town (1)	2–2	Watford (1)	7 January 1984
Replay	Watford	4–3	Luton Town	10 January 1984
16	Shrewsbury Town (2)	3–0	Oldham Athletic (2)	7 January 1984
17	Sheffield United (3)	1–1	Birmingham City (1)	7 January 1984
Replay	Birmingham City	2–0	Sheffield United	10 January 1984
18	Fulham (2)	0–0	Tottenham Hotspur (1)	7 January 1984
Replay	Tottenham Hotspur	2–0	Fulham	11 January 1984
19	Coventry City (1)	1–1	Wolverhampton Wanderers (1)	7 January 1984
Replay	Wolverhampton Wanderers	1–1	Coventry City	10 January 1984
Replay	Coventry City	3–0	Wolverhampton Wanderers	16 January 1984
20	Portsmouth (2)	2–1	Grimsby Town (2)	7 January 1984
21	West Ham United (1)	1–0	Wigan Athletic (3)	7 January 1984
22	Brighton & Hove Albion (2)	2–0	Swansea City (2)	7 January 1984
23	Plymouth Argyle (3)	2–2	Newport County (3)	7 January 1984
Replay	Newport County	0–1	Plymouth Argyle	10 January 1984
24	Carlisle United (2)	1–1	Swindon Town (4)	7 January 1984
Replay	Swindon Town	3–1	Carlisle United	10 January 1984
25	Crystal Palace (2)	1–0	Leicester City (1)	7 January 1984
26	Huddersfield Town (2)	2–1	Queens Park Rangers (1)	7 January 1984
27	Cardiff City (2)	0–3	Ipswich Town (1)	7 January 1984
28	Leeds United (2)	1–1	Scunthorpe United (3)	7 January 1984
Replay	Scunthorpe United	1–1	Leeds United	10 January 1984
Replay	Scunthorpe United	4–2	Leeds United	16 January 1984
29	Stoke City (1)	0–2	Everton (1)	7 January 1984
30	Rotherham United (3)	0–0	West Bromwich Albion (1)	7 January 1984
Replay	West Bromwich Albion	3–0	Rotherham United	11 January 1984
31	Colchester United (4)	0–1	Charlton Athletic (2)	7 January 1984
32	Cambridge United (2)	0–3	Derby County (2)	7 January 1984

== Fourth round proper ==
The fourth round matches were mainly played over the weekend of 28–29 January 1984. Some games were instead played or replayed on 30 January–1 February. Telford United was the last non-league club left in the competition.

Tie no	Home team	Score	Away team	Date
1	Sheffield Wednesday	3–2	Coventry City	30 January 1984
2	Middlesbrough	2–0	AFC Bournemouth	31 January 1984
3	West Bromwich Albion	1–0	Scunthorpe United	1 February 1984
4	Sunderland	1–2	Birmingham City	28 January 1984
5	Derby County	3–2	Telford United (5)	1 February 1984
6	Everton	0–0	Gillingham	28 January 1984
Replay	Gillingham	0–0	Everton	31 January 1984
Replay	Gillingham	0–3	Everton	6 February 1984
7	Swindon Town	1–2	Blackburn Rovers	28 January 1984
8	Shrewsbury Town	2–0	Ipswich Town	28 January 1984
9	Tottenham Hotspur	0–0	Norwich City	28 January 1984
Replay	Norwich City	2–1	Tottenham Hotspur	1 February 1984
10	Portsmouth	0–1	Southampton	28 January 1984
11	Brighton & Hove Albion	2–0	Liverpool	29 January 1984
12	Plymouth Argyle	2–1	Darlington	28 January 1984
13	Crystal Palace	1–1	West Ham United	28 January 1984
Replay	West Ham United	2–0	Crystal Palace	31 January 1984
14	Huddersfield Town	1–2	Notts County	1 February 1984
15	Charlton Athletic	0–2	Watford	28 January 1984
16	Oxford United	2–1	Blackpool	28 January 1984

== Fifth round proper ==
The fifth round matches were all played on 17–18 February 1984, with no replays required. Third Division sides Plymouth Argyle and Oxford United were the lowest-ranked teams in the round.

Tie no	Home team	Score	Away team	Date
1	Watford	3–1	Brighton & Hove Albion	18 February 1984
2	Notts County	1–0	Middlesbrough	18 February 1984
3	Blackburn Rovers	0–1	Southampton	17 February 1984
4	West Bromwich Albion	0–1	Plymouth Argyle	18 February 1984
5	Derby County	2–1	Norwich City	18 February 1984
6	Everton	3–0	Shrewsbury Town	18 February 1984
7	Birmingham City	3–0	West Ham United	18 February 1984
8	Oxford United	0–3	Sheffield Wednesday	18 February 1984

== Sixth round proper ==
The sixth round matches were played on the weekend of 10–11 March 1984 with replays on 14 and 20 March. Plymouth Argyle, from the Third Division, was again the lowest-ranked team in the round.

Tie no	Home team	Score	Away team	Date
1	Notts County	1–2	Everton	10 March 1984
2	Sheffield Wednesday	0–0	Southampton	11 March 1984
Replay	Southampton	5–1	Sheffield Wednesday	20 March 1984
3	Plymouth Argyle	0–0	Derby County	10 March 1984
Replay	Derby County	0–1	Plymouth Argyle	14 March 1984
4	Birmingham City	1–3	Watford	10 March 1984

== Semi-finals ==
14 April 1984

Everton	1–0 (a.e.t)	Southampton
Heath 117'

Highbury, London

Referee:- George Courtney (Spennymoor)

14 April 1984

Watford	1–0	Plymouth Argyle
Reilly 13'

Villa Park, Birmingham

Referee:- Joe Worrall (Warrington)

== Final ==
19 May 1984
15:00 BST

Everton	2–0	Watford
Sharp 38'; Gray 51'	(Report)

Wembley, London
Attendance: 100,000
Referee: John Hunting

Everton	Watford

== Television coverage ==
The right to show FA Cup games were, as with Football League matches, shared between the BBC and ITV network. For the first time, four games were allowed to be screened Live from the Third round to the Sixth round and shared between the two companies, as well as the Final. Other games were shown in a highlights format. ITV coverage was now nationalised for the first time, although a strike prevented ITV coverage of the Third round. No highlights or live games were screened from Rounds One and Two.

Third Round BBC Liverpool v Newcastle United (Live–Friday Evening), Fulham v Tottenham Hotspur, Norwich City v Aston Villa (Midweek replay), Tottenham Hotspur v Fulham (Midweek replay) ITV. No games were broadcast due to strike action.

Fourth Round BBC Shrewsbury Town v Ipswich Town, Tottenham Hotspur v Norwich City, Portsmouth v Southampton ITV Brighton & Hove Albion v Liverpool (Live–Sunday Afternoon), Norwich City v Tottenham Hotspur (Midweek replay)

Fifth Round BBC Blackburn Rovers v Southampton (Live–Friday Evening) ITV Watford v Brighton & Hove Albion, Derby County v Norwich City, Oxford United v Sheffield Wednesday

Sixth Round BBC Birmingham City v Watford, Plymouth Argyle v Derby County, Notts County v Everton, Derby County v Plymouth Argyle (Midweek replay) ITV Sheffield Wednesday v Southampton (Live–Sunday Afternoon)

Semi-Finals BBC Plymouth Argyle v Watford ITV Everton v Southampton

Final Everton v Watford, shown Live by both the BBC and ITV.
