= Minehead A.F.C. =

Association football club in England

Coordinates: 51°12′14″N 3°28′24″W

Minehead
- Full name: Minehead Football Club
- Founded: 1889
- Ground: Recreation Ground, Minehead
- Chairman: Mark Vickers
- Manager: Matt Harris Craig Carr Jameson Branagan
- League: Somerset County League Division One
- 2025–26: Somerset County League Division One, 10th of 15
Home colours	Away colours

Minehead Association Football Club is a football club based in Minehead, Somerset, England. The club are currently members of the Somerset County League Division One and play at the Recreation Ground. The club is affiliated to the Somerset County FA.

== History ==
The club was established in 1889, and initially played in local leagues until joining the Western League in 1923. After finishing in tenth place in 1924–25, they were relegated to the newly established Division Two. However, after finishing bottom in 1926–27 and 1927–28, the club withdrew from the league.

Minehead returned to the Western League in 1949, joining Division Three. After finishing third in their first season back, they were promoted to Division Two. A fourth-place finish in 1957–58 saw the club promoted to Division One. In 1970–71 they reached the first round proper of the FA Cup for the first time, but lost 2–1 at home to Shrewsbury Town.

After finishing as runners-up in 1971–72, the club were elected to Division One South of the Southern League. A fifth-place finish in 1972–73 was followed by finishing fourth in 1973–74 and third in 1974–75, before the club won the division in 1975–76, earning promotion to the Premier Division. The 1976–77 season proved to be the club's greatest; they finished as runners-up in the Premier Division (at the time, the top level below the Football League), and also reached the first round of the FA Cup again, where they beat Swansea City 1–0 at the Vetch Field, before losing 2–1 at Portsmouth.

Despite reaching the second round of the FA Cup the following season, the club were relegated after finishing fourth bottom of the Premier Division. In 1982–83 they finished second bottom in the Midland Division, and dropped back into the Premier Division of the Western League. In 1988–89 they were relegated to Division One after finishing bottom of the league, and finished bottom of Division One the following season. However, the club recovered to win Division One the next season, earning promotion back to the Premier Division.

In 1993–94 the club finished bottom of the Premier Division again, and returned to Division One, where they again finished bottom the following season. In 1998 the club changed its name to Minehead Town, and won Division One in the season that followed, losing only one match all season. However, the club finished bottom of the Premier Division for two consecutive seasons, before returning to Division One. In 2009–10 they finished bottom of Division One and were relegated to the Somerset County League.

== Ground ==
Minehead play their home games at Irnham Road, Minehead, Somerset, TA24 5DP.

== Honours ==
- Southern League Division One South
  - champions (1): 1975–76
- Western League Division One
  - champions (2): 1990–91, 1998–99
- Somerset County League Premier Division
  - Runners Up (1): 2012–13
- Western Football League Alan Young Cup:
  - Winners (1): 1967–68 (Shared with Glastonbury Town)
- Western Football League Combination Challenge cup:
  - Winners (1): 1988–89
- Somerset Professional Cup/Somerset Premier Cup
  - Winners (3): 1960–61, 1973–74, 1976–77

== Records ==
- FA Cup
  - Second Round 1976–77, 1977–78
- FA Trophy
  - Second Round 1973–74, 1976–77, 1978–79
- FA Vase
  - Second Round 1998–99

== Notable former players ==
1. Players that have played/managed in the football league or any foreign equivalent to this level (i.e. fully professional league).
2. Players with full international caps.
3. Players that hold a club record.
- (England) Gerry Cakebread
- (England) Cliff Myers
