= 1976–77 FA Cup =

Tournament details
- Country: England; Wales

Final positions
- Champions: Manchester United (4th title)
- Runners-up: Liverpool

Tournament statistics
- Top goal scorer(s): Jimmy Greenhoff; Kevin Keegan; Jimmy Case; Duncan McKenzie; Bobby Shinton; Ian Edwards (4 goals)

The 1976–77 FA Cup was the 96th staging of the world's oldest football knockout competition, the Football Association Challenge Cup, or FA Cup. The final saw Manchester United defeat Liverpool 2–1.

== Qualifying rounds ==
Most participating clubs that were not members of the Football League competed in the qualifying rounds to secure one of 28 places available in the first round.

The winners from the fourth qualifying round were Gateshead United, Crook Town, Barrow, Droylsden, Morecambe, Northwich Victoria, Altrincham, Boston, Matlock Town, Goole Town, Kettering Town, Nuneaton Borough, Chesham United, Dudley Town, Enfield, Wealdstone, Hitchin Town, Bromley, Hillingdon Borough, Leatherhead, Woking, Harwich & Parkeston, Waterlooville, Dartford, Wycombe Wanderers, Tooting & Mitcham United, Weymouth and Minehead.

Droylsden, Boston and Dudley Town were appearing in the competition proper for the first time. Of the others, Goole Town, Chesham United, Woking and Waterlooville had last featured at this stage in 1968–69; Crook Town had last done so in 1965–66, Harwich & Parkeston in 1963–64, Northwich Victoria in 1961-62 and Bromley in 1951–52. Barrow was appearing in the competition proper for the first time since being voted out of the Football League in 1972. Conversely, Kettering Town was advancing from the qualifying rounds for a record-setting 29th time (surpassing the previous mark established by Gainsborough Trinity in 1966–67).

Northwich Victoria participated in eight rounds of the tournament, defeating Nantwich Town, Witton Albion, Rhyl, Burton Albion, Rochdale, Peterborough United and Watford before going out in the fourth round to Oldham Athletic at the Drill Field.

== First round proper ==
The 48 teams from the Football League Third and Fourth Divisions entered in this round along with the 28 non-league clubs from the qualifying rounds and Scarborough, Stafford Rangers, Wigan Athletic and Wimbledon who were given byes. The first round of games were played on 20 November 1976. Replays were played mainly on 22–24 November, with some postponed until 29 November, 2 December or 6 December.

Tie no	Home team	Score	Away team	Date
1	Enfield	0–0	Harwich & Parkeston	20 November 1976
Replay	Harwich & Parkeston	0–3	Enfield	23 November 1976
2	Chester	1–0	Hartlepool	20 November 1976
3	AFC Bournemouth	0–0	Newport County	20 November 1976
Replay	Newport County	3–0	AFC Bournemouth	23 November 1976
4	Barrow	0–2	Goole Town	20 November 1976
5	Bury	6–0	Workington	20 November 1976
6	Rochdale	1–1	Northwich Victoria	20 November 1976
Replay	Northwich Victoria	0–0	Rochdale	22 November 1976
Replay	Rochdale	1–2	Northwich Victoria	29 November 1976
7	Weymouth	1–1	Hitchin Town	20 November 1976
Replay	Hitchin Town	2–2	Weymouth	24 November 1976
Replay	Weymouth	3–3	Hitchin Town	29 November 1976
Replay	Hitchin Town	3–1	Weymouth	2 December 1976
8	Reading	1–0	Wealdstone	20 November 1976
9	Walsall	0–0	Bradford City	20 November 1976
Replay	Bradford City	0–2	Walsall	24 November 1976
10	Gillingham	0–1	Watford	20 November 1976
11	Sheffield Wednesday	2–0	Stockport County	20 November 1976
12	Crewe Alexandra	1–1	Preston North End	20 November 1976
Replay	Preston North End	2–2	Crewe Alexandra	23 November 1976
Replay	Crewe Alexandra	0–3	Preston North End	29 November 1976
13	Lincoln City	1–0	Morecambe	20 November 1976
14	Stafford Rangers	0–0	Halifax Town	20 November 1976
Replay	Halifax Town	1–0	Stafford Rangers	23 November 1976
15	Swindon Town	7–0	Bromley	20 November 1976
16	Scarborough	0–0	Darlington	20 November 1976
Replay	Darlington	4–1	Scarborough	22 November 1976
17	Doncaster Rovers	2–2	Shrewsbury Town	20 November 1976
Replay	Shrewsbury Town	4–3	Doncaster Rovers	23 November 1976
18	Wrexham	6–0	Gateshead United	20 November 1976
19	Tranmere Rovers	0–4	Peterborough United	20 November 1976
20	Barnsley	3–1	Boston	20 November 1976
21	Brentford	2–0	Chesham United	20 November 1976
22	Crook Town	1–4	Nuneaton Borough	20 November 1976
23	Brighton & Hove Albion	2–2	Crystal Palace	20 November 1976
Replay	Crystal Palace	1–1	Brighton & Hove Albion	23 November 1976
Replay	Brighton & Hove Albion	0–1	Crystal Palace	6 December 1976
24	Wimbledon	1–0	Woking	20 November 1976
25	Exeter City	1–1	Southend United	20 November 1976
Replay	Southend United	2–1	Exeter City	22 November 1976
26	Scunthorpe United	1–2	Chesterfield	20 November 1976
27	Huddersfield Town	0–0	Mansfield Town	20 November 1976
Replay	Mansfield Town	2–1	Huddersfield Town	22 November 1976
28	Southport	1–2	Port Vale	20 November 1976
29	Matlock Town	2–0	Wigan Athletic	20 November 1976
30	Torquay United	1–2	Hillingdon Borough	20 November 1976
31	Kettering Town	1–1	Oxford United	20 November 1976
Replay	Oxford United	0–1	Kettering Town	23 November 1976
32	Rotherham United	5–0	Altrincham	20 November 1976
33	Aldershot	1–1	Portsmouth	20 November 1976
Replay	Portsmouth	2–1	Aldershot	23 November 1976
34	Droylsden	0–0	Grimsby Town	20 November 1976
Replay	Grimsby Town	5–3	Droylsden	23 November 1976
35	Tooting & Mitcham United	4–2	Dartford	20 November 1976
36	Dudley Town	1–1	York City	20 November 1976
Replay	York City	4–1	Dudley Town	23 November 1976
37	Leatherhead	2–0	Northampton Town	20 November 1976
38	Cambridge United	1–1	Colchester United	20 November 1976
Replay	Colchester United	2–0	Cambridge United	24 November 1976
39	Waterlooville	1–2	Wycombe Wanderers	20 November 1976
40	Swansea City	0–1	Minehead	20 November 1976

== Second round proper ==
The second round of games were mainly played on 11 December 1976, with some taking place midweek over 14–15 December and one on 20th. Replays took place on 14th or 21st. Northwich Victoria's initial match against Peterborough United on 11 December was abandoned after 20 minutes due to heavy fog with Peterborough leading 1–0.

Tie no	Home team	Score	Away team	Date
1	Chesterfield	1–1	Walsall	11 December 1976
Replay	Walsall	0–0	Chesterfield	14 December 1976
Replay	Chesterfield	0–1	Walsall	21 December 1976
2	Darlington	1–0	Sheffield Wednesday	15 December 1976
3	Bury	0–0	Shrewsbury Town	14 December 1976
Replay	Shrewsbury Town	2–1	Bury	21 December 1976
4	Grimsby Town	0–1	Chester	11 December 1976
5	Northwich Victoria	4–0	Peterborough United	14 December 1976
6	Lincoln City	6–0	Nuneaton Borough	11 December 1976
7	Wrexham	1–1	Goole Town	11 December 1976
Replay	Goole Town	0–1	Wrexham	14 December 1976
8	Wycombe Wanderers	1–2	Reading	11 December 1976
9	Portsmouth	2–1	Minehead	11 December 1976
10	Crystal Palace	4–0	Enfield	11 December 1976
11	Hitchin Town	1–1	Swindon Town	11 December 1976
Replay	Swindon Town	3–1	Hitchin Town	21 December 1976
12	Southend United	3–0	Newport County	11 December 1976
13	Mansfield Town	2–5	Matlock Town	15 December 1976
14	Port Vale	3–0	Barnsley	11 December 1976
15	Halifax Town	1–0	Preston North End	14 December 1976
16	Kettering Town	1–0	Tooting & Mitcham United	11 December 1976
17	Rotherham United	0–0	York City	11 December 1976
Replay	York City	1–1	Rotherham United	14 December 1976
Replay	Rotherham United	2–1	York City	21 December 1976
18	Colchester United	3–2	Brentford	20 December 1976
19	Leatherhead	1–3	Wimbledon	14 December 1976
20	Hillingdon Borough	2–3	Watford	11 December 1976

== Third round proper ==
Teams from the Football League First and Second Division entered in this round. The third round of games in the FA Cup were played on 8 January 1977. Replays were mainly played midweek over 10–12 January or the week after but one occurred on 24th instead.

Tie no	Home team	Score	Away team	Date
1	Blackpool	0–0	Derby County	8 January 1977
Replay	Derby County	3–2	Blackpool	19 January 1977
2	Darlington	2–2	Orient	8 January 1977
Replay	Orient	0–0	Darlington	11 January 1977
Replay	Darlington	0–3	Orient	17 January 1977
3	Burnley	2–2	Lincoln City	8 January 1977
Replay	Lincoln City	0–1	Burnley	12 January 1977
4	Liverpool	0–0	Crystal Palace	8 January 1977
Replay	Crystal Palace	2–3	Liverpool	11 January 1977
5	Southampton	1–1	Chelsea	8 January 1977
Replay	Chelsea	0–3	Southampton	12 January 1977
6	Leicester City	0–1	Aston Villa	8 January 1977
7	Notts County	0–1	Arsenal	8 January 1977
8	Nottingham Forest	1–1	Bristol Rovers	8 January 1977
Replay	Bristol Rovers	1–1	Nottingham Forest	11 January 1977
Replay	Nottingham Forest	6–0	Bristol Rovers	18 January 1977
9	Northwich Victoria	3–2	Watford	8 January 1977
10	Wolverhampton Wanderers	3–2	Rotherham United	8 January 1977
11	Sunderland	2–2	Wrexham	8 January 1977
Replay	Wrexham	1–0	Sunderland	12 January 1977
12	Everton	2–0	Stoke City	8 January 1977
13	Sheffield United	0–0	Newcastle United	8 January 1977
Replay	Newcastle United	3–1	Sheffield United	24 January 1977
14	Ipswich Town	4–1	Bristol City	8 January 1977
15	Manchester City	1–1	West Bromwich Albion	8 January 1977
Replay	West Bromwich Albion	0–1	Manchester City	11 January 1977
16	Queens Park Rangers	2–1	Shrewsbury Town	8 January 1977
17	Fulham	3–3	Swindon Town	8 January 1977
Replay	Swindon Town	5–0	Fulham	11 January 1977
18	Coventry City	1–0	Millwall	8 January 1977
19	West Ham United	2–1	Bolton Wanderers	8 January 1977
20	Manchester United	1–0	Walsall	8 January 1977
21	Hull City	1–1	Port Vale	8 January 1977
Replay	Port Vale	3–1	Hull City	10 January 1977
22	Carlisle United	5–1	Matlock Town	8 January 1977
23	Oldham Athletic	3–0	Plymouth Argyle	8 January 1977
24	Wimbledon	0–0	Middlesbrough	8 January 1977
Replay	Middlesbrough	1–0	Wimbledon	11 January 1977
25	Southend United	0–4	Chester	8 January 1977
26	Cardiff City	1–0	Tottenham Hotspur	8 January 1977
27	Halifax Town	0–1	Luton Town	8 January 1977
28	Charlton Athletic	1–1	Blackburn Rovers	8 January 1977
Replay	Blackburn Rovers	2–0	Charlton Athletic	12 January 1977
29	Leeds United	5–2	Norwich City	8 January 1977
30	Hereford United	1–0	Reading	8 January 1977
31	Kettering Town	2–3	Colchester United	8 January 1977
32	Birmingham City	1–0	Portsmouth	8 January 1977

== Fourth round proper ==
The fourth round of games were played on 29 January 1977. Four games required a replay, played midweek on 1–2 February. Northwich Victoria was the last non-league club left in the competition.

Tie no	Home team	Score	Away team	Date
1	Chester	1–0	Luton Town	29 January 1977
2	Liverpool	3–0	Carlisle United	29 January 1977
3	Nottingham Forest	3–3	Southampton	29 January 1977
Replay	Southampton	2–1	Nottingham Forest	1 February 1977
4	Blackburn Rovers	3–0	Orient	29 January 1977
5	Aston Villa	3–0	West Ham United	29 January 1977
6	Northwich Victoria	1–3	Oldham Athletic	29 January 1977
7	Middlesbrough	4–0	Hereford United	29 January 1977
8	Swindon Town	2–2	Everton	29 January 1977
Replay	Everton	2–1	Swindon Town	1 February 1977
9	Ipswich Town	2–2	Wolverhampton Wanderers	29 January 1977
Replay	Wolverhampton Wanderers	1–0	Ipswich Town	2 February 1977
10	Newcastle United	1–3	Manchester City	29 January 1977
11	Manchester United	1–0	Queens Park Rangers	29 January 1977
12	Cardiff City	3–2	Wrexham	29 January 1977
13	Port Vale	2–1	Burnley	29 January 1977
14	Arsenal	3–1	Coventry City	29 January 1977
15	Colchester United	1–1	Derby County	29 January 1977
Replay	Derby County	1–0	Colchester United	2 February 1977
16	Birmingham City	1–2	Leeds United	29 January 1977

== Fifth round proper ==
The fifth set of games took place on 26 February 1977. One game went to a replay which was played on 8 March. Holders Southampton were eliminated by Manchester United in a rematch of the previous season's final.

Tie no	Home team	Score	Away team	Date
1	Liverpool	3–1	Oldham Athletic	26 February 1977
2	Southampton	2–2	Manchester United	26 February 1977
Replay	Manchester United	2–1	Southampton	8 March 1977
3	Aston Villa	3–0	Port Vale	26 February 1977
4	Wolverhampton Wanderers	1–0	Chester	26 February 1977
5	Middlesbrough	4–1	Arsenal	26 February 1977
6	Derby County	3–1	Blackburn Rovers	26 February 1977
7	Cardiff City	1–2	Everton	26 February 1977
8	Leeds United	1–0	Manchester City	26 February 1977

== Sixth round proper ==
The sixth round of FA Cup games were played on 19 March 1977. There were no replays.

Tie no	Home team	Score	Away team	Date
1	Liverpool	2–0	Middlesbrough	19 March 1977
2	Wolverhampton Wanderers	0–1	Leeds United	19 March 1977
3	Everton	2–0	Derby County	19 March 1977
4	Manchester United	2–1	Aston Villa	19 March 1977

== Semi-finals ==
=== Semi-final 1 ===
23 April 1977

Liverpool	2–2	Everton
McDermott 10'; Case 73'	Report	McKenzie 34'; Rioch 83'

Maine Road, Manchester
Referee: Clive Thomas, Treorchy

==== Replay ====
27 April 1977

Everton	0–3	Liverpool
	Report	Neal 31' (pen.); Case 88'; Kennedy 89'

Maine Road, Manchester
Attendance: 52,579
Referee: Clive Thomas, Treorchy

=== Semi-final 2 ===
23 April 1977

Manchester United	2–1	Leeds United
J. Greenhoff 7'; Coppell 15'	Report	Clarke 70' (pen.)

Hillsborough, Sheffield
Attendance: 55,000
Referee: Tom Reynolds, Wiltshire

== Final ==
21 May 1977
15:00 BST

Manchester United	2–1	Liverpool
Pearson 51'; J. Greenhoff 55'		Case 53'

Wembley, London
Attendance: 99,252
Referee: Robert Matthewson

Manchester United	Liverpool

== TV coverage ==
The right to show FA Cup games were, as with Football League matches, shared between the BBC and ITV network. All games were shown in a highlights format, except the Final, which was shown live both on BBC1 and ITV. The BBC football highlights programme Match of the Day would show up to three games and the various ITV regional network stations would cover up to one game and show highlights from other games covered elsewhere on the ITV network. No games from Rounds 1 or 2 were shown. Highlights of replays would be shown on either the BBC or ITV.

Third round BBC: Southampton v Chelsea, Cardiff City v Tottenham Hotspur, Blackpool v Derby County, Derby County v Blackpool (Midweek replay) ITV: Leeds United v Norwich City (Yorkshire & Anglia), Wimbledon v Middlesbrough (LWT & Tyne-Tees), Everton v Stoke City (Granada), Leicester v Aston Villa (ATV), Chelsea v Southampton (Midweek replay All regions)

Fourth round BBC: Colchester United v Derby County, Cardiff City v Wrexham, Manchester United v Queens Park Rangers, Derby County v Colchester United (Midweek Replay) ITV: Swindon Town v Everton (HTV & Granada), Arsenal v Coventry City (LWT), Ipswich Town v Wolverhampton Wanderers (Anglia), Birmingham City v Leeds United (ATV & Yorkshire)

Fifth round BBC: Leeds United v Manchester City, Manchester United v Southampton (Midweek Replay) ITV: Southampton v Manchester United (Southern & LWT), Middlesbrough v Arsenal (Tyne-Tees & Yorkshire), Liverpool v Oldham Athletic (Granada), Aston Villa v Port Vale (ATV)

Sixth round BBC: Manchester United v Aston Villa, Everton v Derby County ITV: Liverpool v Middlesbrough (Granada & Tyne-Tees), Wolverhampton Wanderers v Leeds United (ATV & Yorkshire) All ITV regions showed these two games

Semi-finals BBC: Everton v Liverpool, Everton v Liverpool (Midweek replay) ITV: Leeds United v Manchester United Shown in all ITV regions

Final Liverpool v Manchester United Shown live by both BBC & ITV
