= Dunstable Town F.C. =

English football club

Coordinates: 51°53′34″N 0°32′21″W

Dunstable Town
- Full name: Dunstable Town Football Club
- Nickname: The Blues
- Founded: 1883
- Dissolved: 2026
- Ground: Creasey Park, Dunstable
Home colours	Away colours

Dunstable Town Football Club was a football club based in Dunstable, Bedfordshire, England.

== History ==
The club was established in October 1883 and were founder members of the Bedfordshire FA the following year. In their first competitive match they lost 4–3 to Luton Montrose in the Bedfordshire Senior Cup after being 3–0 up. However, the following season the club won the competition. In 1950 the club joined the Metropolitan League, and in 1956–57 they reached the first round of the FA Cup for the first time, eventually losing 3–1 at Margate.

In 1961 Dunstable switched to the United Counties League, but left after two seasons to rejoin the Metropolitan League, becoming one of only three first teams playing in Division Two. The following season saw the club moved into Division One, but in 1965 they were admitted to Division One of the Southern League. League restructuring saw them placed in the new Division One North for the 1971–72 season. They were moved into Division One South the following season and finished bottom of the division. Transferred back to Division One North for the 1973–74 season, they finished bottom of the table again.

Barry Fry had become Dunstable manager towards the end of the 1973–74 season, and with chairman Keith Cheeseman providing him with blank cheques, Fry attracted several big name players to the club, most notably Jeff Astle and George Best, as well as arranging a friendly match against his former club Manchester United. Although Best only played in two friendly matches and made no competitive appearances for the club, Astle stayed at the club for that season and scored 34 goals as they finished as Division One North runners-up, earning promotion to the Premier Division. However, huge debts caused the club to fold midway through the 1975–76 season; a new club under the name Dunstable was formed to take over their fixtures. Despite finishing eighth in the league, they were demoted to Division One North.

Dunstable were transferred to Division One South for the 1978–79 season, and the following year league restructuring saw them placed in the Southern Division. They remained in the division until the end of the 1993–94 season, after which they folded. The club was re-established in 1998 and joined Division One of the Spartan South Midlands League. After winning the division in 1999–2000 without losing a match, they were promoted to the Senior Division. The following season saw them finish as Senior Division runners-up, earning promotion to the Premier Division. The club went on to win the Premier Division in 2002–03 and were promoted to Division One North of the Isthmian League.

With the formation of the Conference North and South, a fifth-place finish in 2003–04 was enough for Dunstable to be promoted, although they were transferred to the Premier Division of the Southern League. However, they were relegated to the Western Division at the end of the 2004–05 season, which saw them finish in the bottom three. The following season saw them finish in the relegation zone, but the club were reprieved due to FA restructuring and moved to Division One Midlands. However, they were relegated back to the Spartan South Midlands League at the end of the 2008–09 season following a 13-point deduction.

In 2012–13 Dunstable won the Spartan South Midlands League without losing a match, as well as winning the league's Challenge Trophy and the Bedfordshire Premier Cup. After promotion to Division One Central of the Southern League, they went on to win the division at the first attempt, as well as the league's Champions Trophy, and were promoted to the Premier Division. In 2017–18 the club finished bottom of the Premier Division and were relegated to Division One Central. The following season saw them finish bottom of Division One Central, resulting in relegation to the Premier Division of the Spartan South Midlands League. At the end of the 2025–26 season the club merged with AFC Dunstable to form Dunstable FC.

=== Reserve team ===
The club's reserve team joined Division One of the South Midlands League in 1951. They finished as runners-up in their first season, earning promotion to the Premier Division. They left the league in 1954, switching to the Hellenic League. They were Premier Division runners-up in 1957–58, after which they switched to the United Counties League. They went on to win back-to-back United Counties League titles in 1958–59 and 1959–60, but were demoted to Division Two in 1961 when the club's first team joined the league. In 1964 they returned to the Hellenic League, and were placed in Division One, but took over from the first team in the Metropolitan League for the 1965–66 season. They rejoined Division One of the United Counties League in 1967, but left at the end of the 1968–69 season.

== Ground ==
From 1950 the club played at Kingsway, until moving to Brewers Hill. The ground was later renamed Creasey Park after Wally Creasey, one of the first directors of the club.

== Honours ==
- Southern League
  - Division One Central champions 2013–14
  - Champions Cup winners 2013–14
- Spartan South Midlands League
  - Premier Division champions 2002–03, 2012–13
  - Division One champions 1999–2000
  - Challenge Trophy winners 2012–2013
- Bedfordshire Premier Cup:
  - Winners 1980–81, 1982–83, 1990–91, 2006–07, 2011–12, 2012–13
- Bedfordshire Senior Cup
  - Winners 1895–96, 1956–57, 1959–60, 1979–80, 1982–83, 1985–86, 1986–87, 1987–88, 1988–89, 2002–03, 2006–07, 2008–09
- Bedfordshire Intermediate Cup
  - Winners 1999–2000, 2008–09
- Bedfordshire Floodlit Cup
  - Winners 2007–08

== Records ==
- Best FA Cup performance: First round, 1956–57
- Best FA Trophy performance: First round, 2004–05
- Best FA Vase performance: Fifth round, 2010–11
- Record attendance: c. 10,000 vs Manchester United, friendly, July 1974
- Biggest win: 12–0 vs Welwyn Garden City, Spartan South Midlands League, 2009–10
- Heaviest defeat: 13–0 vs Arsenal 'A', Metropolitan League
- Record transfer fee received: £20,000 from Reading for Kerry Dixon, 1980

== See also ==
- Dunstable Town F.C. players
- Dunstable Town F.C. managers
