= Guildford & Dorking United F.C. =

Former football club in Surrey, England

Guildford & Dorking United
- Full name: Guildford & Dorking United Football Club
- Founded: 1974
- Dissolved: 1976
- 1975–76: Southern League Division One South, 15th

Guildford & Dorking United F.C. refers to the brief merger from 1974 to 1976 between the two English football clubs Dorking F.C. and Guildford United F.C. They played in the Southern Football League for only two seasons. Briefly giving Tier 5 football to the town of Dorking for the first time playing at Meadowbank. Tier 5 football was not resurrected until 2022–23 when Dorking Wanderers F.C. were promoted to the National League premier division.

== History ==
In August 1970, Guildford United F.C. sold their Joseph's Road ground in Guildford, Surrey, in order to service an overdraft of £18,000, which had to be paid by the following April. It was intended that the club would continue to play at the ground, but would need to move to a new site by the middle of the decade. Towards the end of 1973, it became clear that the club would have to vacate Joseph's Road in the summer of 1974, so that it could be developed. Bill Bellerby, Mayor of Guildford and club chairman, offered a two-year, temporary relocation to Bannister's Farm, after which the team would move to permanent premises at Slyfield Green. Although Guildford Borough Council offered to cover the costs of preparing the pitch at Bannister's Farm to league standards, the club decided to seek a merger with Dorking F.C. instead. The Dorking ground at Meadowbank was to be the home ground of the combined club.

The move to Dorking was unpopular with the local fans in Guildford. By November 1974, three months after the merge had taken effect, Guildford & Dorking United F.C. were second from bottom in the league, match attendances had dipped below 600 and the club was losing around £700 per week. In early December 1976, the club withdrew from the league after being served a tax demand for £1500 relating to the 1974–75 season.

== Records ==
- FA Cup
  - Fourth Qualifying Round 1974–75
- FA Trophy
  - Second Qualifying Round 1975–76
