= Stevenage Athletic F.C. =

Stevenage Athletic
- Full name: Stevenage Athletic Football Club
- Founded: 1968
- Dissolved: 1976
- Ground: Broadhall Way, Stevenage
- 1975–76: Southern League Division One North, 22/22

Stevenage Athletic F.C. was an English football club based in Stevenage, Hertfordshire. The club existed from 1968 until being declared bankrupt in 1976, after which Stevenage Borough were established.

== History ==
The club was established in 1968 after the dissolution of Stevenage Town. The new club joined the Metropolitan League. They finished second in 1969–70 and were promoted to Division One of the Southern League. In 1971 they were placed in Division One North after the league was expanded to three divisions. They applied to join the Eastern Counties League (a lower league) in 1974, but were rejected. The club finished bottom of the division in 1975–76, and resigned from the league on 13 August 1976. After their demise, the club's Broadhall Way ground was subsequently dug up for non-footballing purposes after the council sold the land to a local businessman.

== Honours ==
- Metropolitan League
  - Metropolitan League Autumn Shield winners 1969–70
  - Dave Mackay Challenge Trophy winners 1973–74

== Records ==
- Best FA Cup performance: Third qualifying round replay, 1974–75
- Best FA Trophy performance: Second qualifying round replay, 1973–74

== See also ==
- Stevenage Athletic F.C. players
