= Waterlooville F.C. =

- Full name: Waterlooville Football Club
- Nickname: The Ville
- Founded: 1902
- Dissolved: 1998
- Ground: Jubilee Park, Waterlooville
- Capacity: 6,000
- League: Southern Football League
- 1997–98: Southern League Division One South, 10/22
Home colours	Away colours

Waterlooville F.C. was a long running amateur, and then semi-professional, football club based in Waterlooville, Hampshire.

They were known as "The Ville" and played at Jubilee Park until 1998 when they merged with Havant Town to form Havant & Waterlooville.

== History ==
Waterlooville F.C. was established in 1902 and initially played in the local Waterlooville & District League. Shortly before World War II they joined the Portsmouth League, immediately winning the Division Three title. After the war they won Division Two and after a few years in Division One they won three consecutive titles. In 1953 they joined the Hampshire League and in 1968–69 reached the first round of the FA Cup for the first time, where they lost 2–1 to Kettering Town.

In 1971 Waterlooville were promoted to Division One South of the Southern League and relinquished their amateur status to turn semi-professional. They won the division in their first season and were promoted to the Premier Division. However, they finished bottom of the Premier Division the following season and were relegated back to Division One South. In 1976–77 they reached the first round of the FA Cup again, losing 2–1 at home to Wycombe Wanderers in a match which set the Jubilee Park attendance record of 4,500. When the league was reorganised in 1982 they were placed in the Premier Division, but were relegated back to Division One South in 1982–83, despite also reaching the final of the Southern League Cup, losing to Alvechurch. The following season, under the stewardship of manager John Milkins, they again reached the first round of the FA Cup, holding Northampton Town to two 1–1 draws, before losing a second replay 2–0.

Ville lifted the Southern League Cup in 1986–87 after winning both legs of the two-legged final against Hednesford Town. The following season they finished second and were promoted back to the Premier Division. In 1988–89 they reached the first round of the FA Cup for the fourth and final time, losing 4–1 at home to Aylesbury United. They remained in the Premier Division until relegation at the end of the 1993–94 season.

Following the sale of Jubilee Park in 1998, the club merged with neighbours and league rivals Havant Town to form Havant & Waterlooville.

== Honours ==
- Hampshire Football Association
  - Senior Cup winners 1969-70, 1972–73, 1984–85 and 1991-92. Finalists 1973-74, 1975–76, 1990–91, 1995–96 and 1996–97
  - Russell Cotes Cup winners 1988-89
- Portsmouth Football Association
  - Senior Cup winners 1968-69
  - Junior Cup winners 1921-22 and 1946–47
- Southern League
  - Division One South champions 1971–72
  - Southern Division runners-up 1987–88
  - League Cup winners 1986–87, finalists 1982–83
- Hampshire League
  - Division 1 runners-up 1969-70
  - Division 2 champions 1959-60 and 1964–65
  - Division 3 East runners-up 1953-54
- Portsmouth & District League
  - Division 1 champions 1949-50, 1950–51 and 1951–52
  - Division 2 champions 1946-47
  - Division 3 champions 1938-39
- Other
  - Portsmouth Victory Cup winners 1959-60 and 1969–70
  - Gosport War Memorial Cup winners 1968-69 and 1979–80

== Playing records ==
=== League ===
Season	Division	Position	Significant events
1946-53	Portsmouth & District League		
1953/54	Hampshire League Div 3 East	2/14	Promoted
1954/55	Hampshire League Division 2	9/14	
1955/56	Hampshire League Division 2	10/16	
1956/57	Hampshire League Division 2	14/16	
1957/58	Hampshire League Division 2	4/16	
1958/59	Hampshire League Division 2	4/16	
1959/60	Hampshire League Division 2	1/16	Promoted
1960/61	Hampshire League Division 1	7/16	
1961/62	Hampshire League Division 1	10/16	
1962/63	Hampshire League Division 1	11/16	
1963/64	Hampshire League Division 1	15/16	Relegated
1964/65	Hampshire League Division 2	1/16	Promoted
1965/66	Hampshire League Division 1	4/16	
1966/67	Hampshire League Division 1	5/16	
1967/68	Hampshire League Division 1	4/16	
1968/69	Hampshire League Division 1	5/16	
1969/70	Hampshire League Division 1	2/16	
1970/71	Hampshire League Division 1	6/16	Promoted
1971/72	Southern League Div 1 South	1/16	Promoted
1972/73	Southern League Premier Div	22/22	Relegated
1973/74	Southern League Div 1 South	3/20	
1974/75	Southern League Div 1 South	6/20	
1975/76	Southern League Div 1 South	8/20	
1976/77	Southern League Div 1 South	3/18	
1977/78	Southern League Div 1 South	4/20	
1978/79	Southern League Div 1 South	8/21	
1979/80	Southern League Southern Div	12/24	
1980/81	Southern League Southern Div	5/24	
1981/82	Southern League Southern Div	7/24	
1982/83	Southern League Premier Div	18/20	
1983/84	Southern League Southern Div	12/20	
1984/85	Southern League Southern Div	9/20	
1985/86	Southern League Southern Div	10/21	
1986/87	Southern League Southern Div	11/20	
1987/88	Southern League Southern Div	2/21	Promoted
1988/89	Southern League Premier Div	17/22	
1989/90	Southern League Premier Div	16/22	
1990/91	Southern League Premier Div	20/22	
1991/92	Southern League Premier Div	15/22	
1992/93	Southern League Premier Div	11/21	
1993/94	Southern League Premier Div	20/22	Relegated
1994/95	Southern League Southern Div	4/22	
1995/96	Southern League Southern Div	3/22	
1996/97	Southern League Southern Div	15/22	
1997/98	Southern League Southern Div	10/22	Merged with Havant Town

=== FA Cup ===
Season	Round	Opponents	Result
1966/67	1st Qualifying Round	A v Chichester City	D 2-2
	Replay	H v Chichester City	W 4-1
	2nd Qualifying Round	H v Salisbury	L 0-2
1967/68	1st Qualifying Round	H v Selsey	D 2-2
	Replay	A v Selsey	L 2-3
1968/69	1st Qualifying Round	H v Basingstoke Town	W 2-1
	2nd Qualifying Round	H v Newport	W 3-0
	3rd Qualifying Round	H v Salisbury	W 4-2
	4th Qualifying Round	A v Falmouth Town	D 2-2
	Replay	H v Falmouth Town	D 1-1
	2nd Replay	A v Falmouth Town	W 2-1
	Round 1	H v Kettering Town	L 1-2
1969/70	1st Qualifying Round	A v Selsey	W 4-3
	2nd Qualifying Round	A v Andover	L 1-2
1970/71	1st Qualifying Round	H v Thornycroft Athletic	D 1–1
	Replay	A v Thornycroft Athletic	D 0-0
	2nd Replay	H v Thornycroft Athletic	W 1-0
	2nd Qualifying Round	A v Gosport Borough	W 3-2
	3rd Qualifying Round	A v Basingstoke Town	D 0-0
	Replay	H v Basingstoke Town	W 1-0
	4th Qualifying Round	H v Ringmer	L 2-3
1973/74	Preliminary Round	H v Sidley United	W 4-0
	1st Qualifying Round	A v Haywards Heath	D 1-1
	Replay	A v Haywards Heath	W 3-1
	2nd Qualifying Round	A v Worthing	L 1-2
1974/75	1st Qualifying Round	A v Basingstoke Town	L 1-3
1975/76	1st Qualifying Round	H v Littlehampton Town	D 2-2
	Replay	A v Littlehampton Town	W 3-1
	2nd Qualifying Round	H v Poole Town	W 3-0
	3rd Qualifying Round	H v Gosport Borough	W 4-0
	4th Qualifying Round	A v Sutton United	D 1-1
	Replay	H v Sutton United	L 1-3
1976/77	1st Qualifying Round	H v Cowes Sports	W 9-0
	2nd Qualifying Round	A v Swaythling Athletic	W 6-2
	3rd Qualifying Round	A v Basingstoke Town	W 2-1
	4th Qualifying Round	H v Hendon	W 4-1
	Round 1	H v Wycombe Wanderers	L 1-2
1977/78	Preliminary Round	A v Southwick	W 1–0
	1st Qualifying Round	A v Newport	D 0-0
	Replay	H v Newport	L 0–1
1978/79	1st Qualifying Round	A v Fareham Town	W 2-0
	2nd Qualifying Round	A v Bognor Regis Town	W 2-0
	3rd Qualifying Round	A v Worthing	D 1-1
	Replay	H v Worthing	W 3-0
	4th Qualifying Round	H v Maidstone United	L 1-2
1979/80	1st Qualifying Round	A v Camberley Town	W 2-1
	2nd Qualifying Round	A v Poole Town	D 0-0
	Replay	H v Poole Town	L 0–2
1980/81	1st Qualifying Round	H v Horsham YMCA	W 2-0
	2nd Qualifying Round	H v Windsor & Eton	D 0-0
	Replay	A v Windsor & Eton	L 1–4
1981/82	Preliminary Round	A v Pagham	L 0-3
1982/83	Preliminary Round	H v Bracknell Town	L 1-2
1983/84	1st Qualifying Round	A v Road-Sea Southampton	D 0-0
	Replay	H v Road-Sea Southampton	W 2-1
	2nd Qualifying Round	A v Hungerford Town	D 3-3
	Replay	H v Hungerford Town	W 3-0
	3rd Qualifying Round	A v AFC Totton	D 1-1
	Replay	H v AFC Totton	W 3-0
	4th Qualifying Round	H v Wokingham Town	W 3-2
	Round 1	A v Northampton Town	D 1-1
	Replay	H v Northampton Town	D 1-1
	2nd Replay	A v Northampton Town	L 0-2
1984/85	1st Qualifying Round	A v Clevedon Town	L 2-3
1985/86	1st Qualifying Round	A v Worthing	L 0-3
1986/87	1st Qualifying Round	H v Sheppey United	L 0-1
1987/88	Preliminary Round	A v Shortwood United	W 6-1
	1st Qualifying Round	A v Havant Town	W 2-0
	2nd Qualifying Round	H v Yeovil Town	D 1-1
	Replay	A v Yeovil Town	L 2-3
1988/89	1st Qualifying Round	H v Chippenham Town	W 2-0
	2nd Qualifying Round	A v Hungerford Town	W 2-0
	3rd Qualifying Round	H v Gosport Borough	W 1-0
	4th Qualifying Round	A v Farnborough Town	W 3-2
	Round 1	H v Aylesbury United	L 1-4
1989/90	1st Qualifying Round	A v Littlehampton Town	L 1-3
1990/91	1st Qualifying Round	H v Newport IoW	D 1-1
	Replay	H v Newport IoW	L 0-3
1991/92	1st Qualifying Round	A v Swanage Town & Herston	D 1-1
	Replay	H v Swanage Town & Herston	W 2-0
	2nd Qualifying Round	H Thame United	D 3-2
	Replay	A v Thame United	L 2-3
1992/93	1st Qualifying Round	H v Cheltenham Town	D 0-0
	Replay	A v Cheltenham Town	L 0-2
1993/94	1st Qualifying Round	H v Salisbury City	W 1-0
	2nd Qualifying Round	H v Thatcham Town	W 3-0
	3rd Qualifying Round	A v Wimborne Town	W 1-0
	4th Qualifying Round	H v Gravesend & Northfleet	L 1-3
1994/95	1st Qualifying Round	H v Westbury United	W 1-0
	2nd Qualifying Round	H v Thame United	W 4-0
	3rd Qualifying Round	A v Salisbury City	D 3-3
	Replay	H v Salisbury City	L 0-1
1995/96	1st Qualifying Round	H v Calne Town	W 5-0
	2nd Qualifying Round	A v Weymouth	L 0-1
1996/97	Preliminary Round	A v Fleet Town	L 0-2
1997/98	Preliminary Round	H v Reading Town	W 2-0
	1st Qualifying Round	A v Melksham Town	W 2-1
	2nd Qualifying Round	A v Portsmouth Royal Navy	D 1-1
	Replay	H v Portsmouth Royal Navy	W 7-0
	3rd Qualifying Round	A v Gloucester City	L 0-2

=== FA Trophy ===
Season	Round	Opponents	Result
1972/73	Preliminary Round	A v Wealdstone	L 0-1
1973/74	1st Qualifying Round	H v Fleet Town	W 4-1
	2nd Qualifying Round	H v Guildford City	L 0-1
1974/75	Preliminary Round	A v Basingstoke Town	L 0-4
1975/76	Preliminary Round	A v Metropolitan Police	L 0-4
1976/77	Preliminary Round	H v Guildford & Dorking United	W 1-0
	1st Qualifying Round	H v Poole Town	W 2-1
	2nd Qualifying Round	H v Chesham United	W 5–0
	3rd Qualifying Round	A v Basingstoke Town	D 1-1
	Replay	H v Basingstoke Town	W 2–1
	Round 1	H v Hastings United	D 1-1
	Replay	A v Hastings United	W 1-0
	Round 2	H v Hendon	L 0-2
1977/78	1st Qualifying Round	H v Metropolitan Police	W 2-0
	2nd Qualifying Round	A v Bridport	W 2–0
	3rd Qualifying Round	H v Dartford	L 0-1
1978/79	1st Qualifying Round	A v Woking	D 2-2
	Replay	H v Woking	D 2-2
	2nd Replay	H v Woking	D 0-0
	3rd Replay	A v Woking	L 0-1
1979/80	Preliminary Round	A v Gosport Borough	L 1-2
1980/81	1st Qualifying Round	H v Hayes	W 2-1
	2nd Qualifying Round	H v Margate	D 1-1
	Replay	A v Margate	L 1-3
1981/82	1st Qualifying Round	H v Staines Town	D 2-2
	Replay	A v Staines Town	L 0-1
1982/83	1st Qualifying Round	H v Chatham Town	W 2-1
	2nd Qualifying Round	H v Clandown	W 4-2
	3rd Qualifying Round	A v Leatherhead	W 5-2
	Round 1	H v Carshalton Athletic	L 1-2
1983/84	1st Qualifying Round	A v Bognor Regis Town	D 1-1
	Replay	H v Bognor Regis Town	L 0-3
1984/85	1st Qualifying Round	A v Canterbury City	L 0-1
1985/86	1st Qualifying Round	H v Canterbury City	W 3-1
	2nd Qualifying Round	A v Fareham Town	D 1-1
	Replay	H v Fareham Town	W 3-2
	3rd Qualifying Round	H v Carshalton Athletic	W 4-3
	Round 1	A v Enfield	L 0-3
1986/87	1st Qualifying Round	A v Bracknell Town	L 2-5
1987/88	1st Qualifying Round	H v Weston Super-Mare	W 4-1
	2nd Qualifying Round	H v Clandown	W 3-1
	3rd Qualifying Round	H v Winsor & Eton	L 0-2
1988/89	1st Qualifying Round	A v Worcester City	L 0-4
1989/90	1st Qualifying Round	A v Walton & Hersham	L 0-2
1990/91	1st Qualifying Round	A Dorking	L 1-2
1991/92	1st Qualifying Round	H v Crawley Town	W 3-2
	2nd Qualifying Round	A v Walton & Hersham	D 1-1
	Replay	H v Walton & Hersham	L 0-4
1992/93	1st Qualifying Round	A v Dorchester Town	L 1-3
1993/94	2nd Qualifying Round	A v Poole Town	D 1-1
	Replay	H v Poole Town	W 2-0
	3rd Qualifying Round	H v Wokingham Town	W 3-0
	Round 1	H v Bromsgrove Rovers	D 1-1
	Replay	A v Bromsgrove Rovers	L 1-2
1994/95	1st Qualifying Round	A v Havant Town	L 1-3
1995/96	1st Qualifying Round	A v Hendon	D 2-2
	Replay	H v Hendon	L 0-1
1996/97	1st Qualifying Round	A v Dorchester Town	L 0-1
1997/98	1st Qualifying Round	H v Fisher Athletic	W 2-1
	2nd Qualifying Round	A v Margate	L 2-3

== Former players ==
Notable former players include three who went on to play professional football in England, Paul Hardyman (transferred to Portsmouth in 1983), Guy Whittingham (to Portsmouth via Yeovil Town in 1989) and Paul Moody (to Southampton in 1991). Additionally, several players joined Ville after a professional career, including Vince Hilaire, Billy Gilbert, Joe Laidlaw, Gary Stanley, and Ray Pointer. Calvin Hore holds the club record for player appearances, with 801. He made his debut, aged 16, in September 1980, and aside from one season on the books of Portsmouth (1981–82), was a regular first team member until the club played its last match in May 1998. He was also club captain for most of the 1990s.

== Ground ==
Waterlooville played at Jubilee Park, Aston Road, Waterlooville, Hampshire, PO7 7SZ.

Opened in 1957, the stadium had a 6,000 capacity with a large 500 seater grandstand, along with a covered terrace behind both goals. The record attendance of 4,500 was recorded in 1976 for the FA Cup meeting against Wycombe Wanderers.

Jubilee Park closed in 1998 after being sold. Residential housing, known as Coronation Road, has since been built on the site. The rows of poplar trees which marked the southern and western boundaries of the football ground remain.

The merged club play at Havant Town's Westleigh Park. Over the years, the ground has seen significant developments - enabling 'the Hawks' to progress further up the pyramid system.

== Local rivalries ==
Waterlooville enjoyed a long-running rivalry with a number of local clubs, most notably Horndean and neighbours Havant Town - with whom they eventually merged.

== Successor club ==
In 2025, a new club, Waterlooville AFC, was formed to restore the town's footballing identity.

They are affiliated to the Hampshire Football Association and for the 2026-27 season, will participate in the Southampton League Premier Division with their home games being played at AFC Portchester until a suitable venue within the town is found.
