= Milton Keynes City F.C. =

Amateur youth and adult football club

The name Milton Keynes City Football Club (commonly abbreviated to MK City) currently refers to a grassroots youth and adult football club based in Milton Keynes. It also refers to two defunct English football clubs, both of which were non-League sides based in Milton Keynes, Buckinghamshire. The first, Bletchley Town FC, changed its name to Milton Keynes City in 1974, and used the name until its dissolution in 1985. The second, originally called Mercedes-Benz, became MK City in 1998, and retained the name until its own demise in 2003, coinciding with the relocation of Wimbledon F.C. to Milton Keynes.

== First former incarnation (1974–85) ==
Milton Keynes City
- Full name: Milton Keynes City Football Club
- Nickname(s): The Gladiators
- Founded: 1956 (as Bletchley & WIPAC)
- Dissolved: 1985
- Ground: City Ground, Manor Field, Bletchley
- Capacity: 4,000
- 1983–84: South Midlands League, Midland Division, 19th

The first version was a Southern League team founded in 1956 as "Bletchley & WIPAC football club" before changing their name a year later to Bletchley Town. The club changed name again in 1974 to become "Milton Keynes City F.C.". The club was poorly supported and was relatively unsuccessful, never reaching the top half of their league. The club's only major achievement was victory in the 1979–80 Berks & Bucks Senior Cup. In 1979, after yet another poor season which saw the club finish second from bottom, Ron Noades, then chairman of Wimbledon, claimed to have entered talks with the Milton Keynes Development Corporation, although this was denied by the corporation, about the possibility of moving the south London club to Milton Keynes. Noades purchased a controlling interest in Milton Keynes City and installed fellow Wimbledon directors including Sam Hammam, Bernie Coleman and Jimmy Rose as directors on top of their identical roles at Wimbledon, which at that time was still legal under the Football Association's rules. His intention was to merge the two clubs to produce a club based in Milton Keynes using Wimbledon's place in the Football League. This idea was never seriously developed and was abandoned when he sold his interest in Milton Keynes City the following year. Further poor seasons followed with no financial backing and eventually the club was wound up five years later at the end of the 1984–85 season.

During their existence, Milton Keynes City were known as 'the Gladiators' and played their home games at the City Ground, Manor Field in Bletchley – a stadium with a 4,000 capacity. Colours were tangerine and black. Under their original identity the team twice reached the 4th Qualifying round of the FA Cup in the mid-sixties.

== Second former incarnation (1998–2003) ==
Milton Keynes City
- Full name: Milton Keynes City Football Club
- Nickname(s): City
- Founded: 1990s (as Mercedes-Benz F.C.)
- Dissolved: 2003
- Ground: Wolverton Park
- 2002–03: Spartan South Midlands Football League, 9th

The second version only existed for a few seasons from the late 1990s, playing in the Spartan South Midlands League Premier Division. The 1990s club began as a Sunday league football club known as "Mercedes-Benz Football Club", after the factory where many of the players worked. The team changed their name to "Milton Keynes City F.C." in 1998, and moved into Wolverton Park, which had been the home of Wolverton A.F.C. until their demise six years earlier. As with Bletchley in the 1970s, City's directors believed that they could build their club up to be accepted as representing Milton Keynes as a whole, but a severe lack of local interest in this plan meant that they never achieved it. Following the resignation of the directors in June 2003, the team folded in July, unable to secure the investment needed to continue. The club's chairman, Bob Flight, cited both a lack of any local football interest in the area and "the confused situation" surrounding Wimbledon F.C.'s proposed move to Milton Keynes, which happened two months later. (Wimbledon were renamed Milton Keynes Dons the following year, in July 2004).

== Current incarnation (2005 onwards) ==
Milton Keynes City
- Full name: Milton Keynes City Football Club
- Short name: City
- Founded: 1986 (as Milton Keynes City Youth FC)
- Ground: Tattenhoe Lane Playing Fields, Bletchley, MK3 7RB
- Website: http://mkcityfc.co.uk/

The former Milton Keynes City Youth FC, an amateur youth football club, renamed itself as Milton Keynes City FC in 2005 and says that it is amongst the larger youth clubs in the locality.

The club says that it is particularly strong in female football and have almost equal number of male and female players and teams. They are strong proponents of the women's game and are often featured in the media, especially during the UEFA Women's Euro 2022 tournament win.

== See also ==
- Current non-League clubs in the Milton Keynes borough
