= List of Bath City F.C. players =

List of players

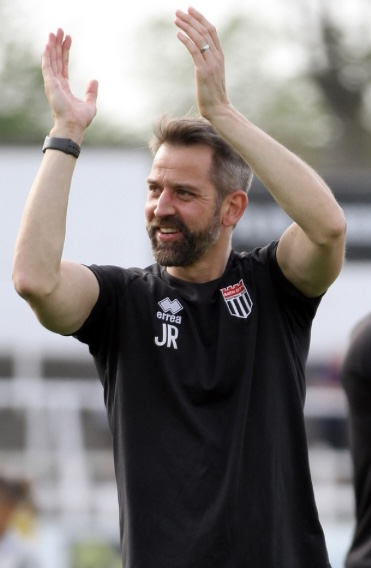
Jim Rollo as assistant manager for the club in 2017

Bath City Football Club was founded in 1889 as Bath AFC, and changed its name to Bath City in 1905. The club was heavily discussed for entry into the Football League Third Division during the 1930s, though Bath missed out on election to the Football League on multiple occasions, including 1935, 1978 and 1985. Upon the outbreak of the Second World War, the club won the Football League North – making them the only non-League football club to have ever won an English Football League trophy. Bath reached the third round of the FA Cup six times, beating league sides such as Crystal Palace (in 1931), Millwall (in 1959), and Cardiff City (in 1992).

The club were crowned Southern League champions in 1960 and 1978; one of the highest levels of non-League football at the time. After a period of relative decline in the 1990s whilst in the Conference, Bath were demoted to the seventh tier in 2004, the lowest level the club has ever played at. They were promoted in 2007, and then again in 2010, and played in the Conference for the first time since 1997, though the club were relegated in 2012 and have played in the National League South since. Bath's record appearance maker is Dave Mogg, who made 515 appearances over a 16-year period with the club. Tony Ricketts has the second most appearances with 506. Players with more than 400 appearances include Dave Singleton, Dave Palmer and Jim Rollo.

== Key ==
- The list is ordered first by number of appearances, and then date of debut.
- Statistics are correct up to February 2026.

Positions key
Pre-1960s		1960s–	
GK	Goalkeeper		
FB	Full back	DF	Defender
HB	Half back	MF	Midfielder
FW	Forward		

Nationality
Unless otherwise noted, the nationality of a player is determined by the country/countries for which he has played international football, or if the player has not played international football, his country of birth.
Position
Playing positions are listed according to the tactical formations that were employed at the time. Thus the change in the names of defensive and midfield positions reflects the tactical evolution that occurred from the 1960s onwards.
Club career
Club career is defined as the first and last calendar years in which the player appeared for the club in any of the competitions listed below.
Total appearances and Total goals
Appearances and goals are for first-team competitive matches only, including Southern League, Alliance premier league, National League, National League South, FA Cup and FA Trophy. Matches from the abandoned 1939–40 season are excluded.

== Players ==
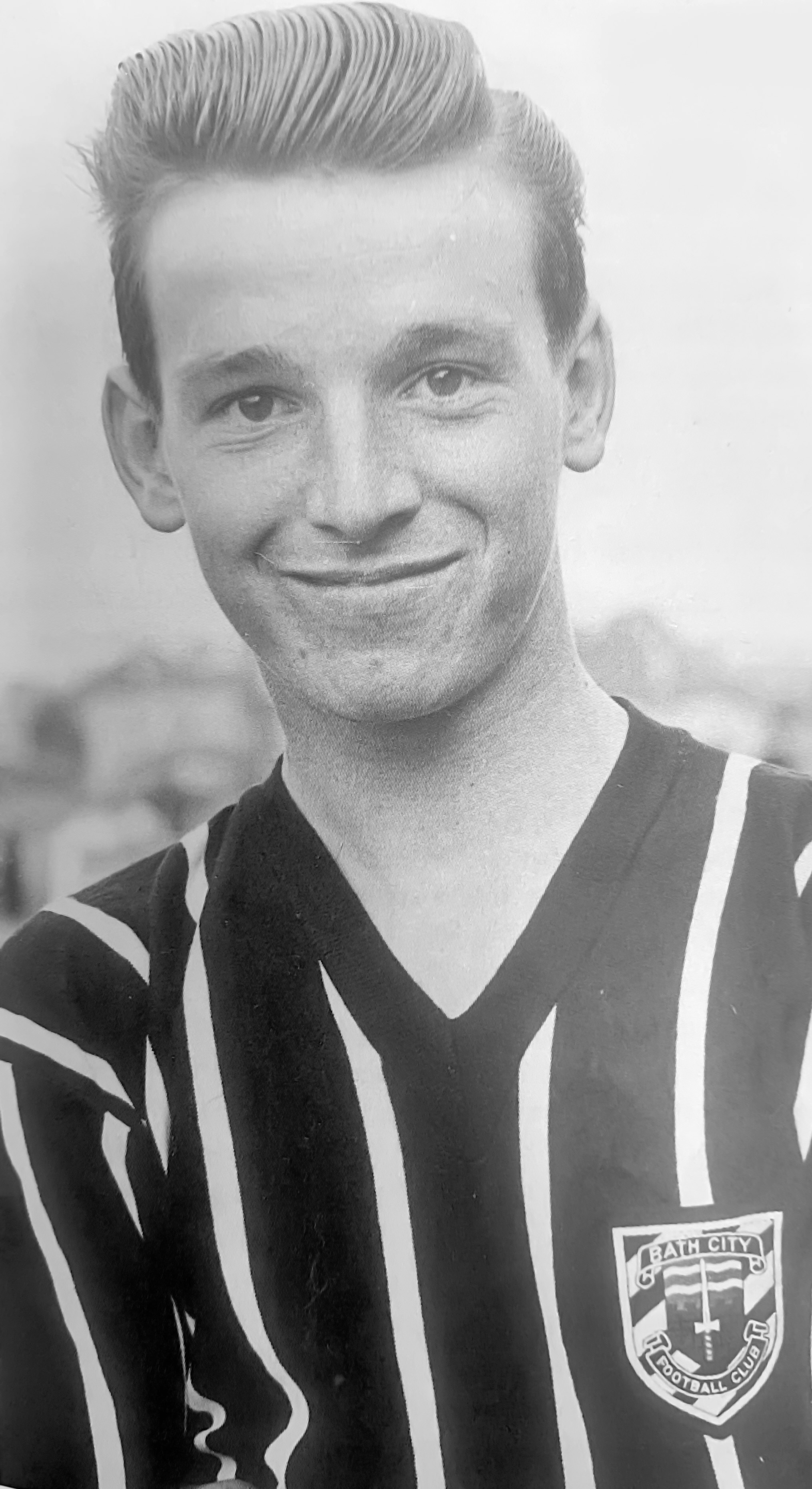
Known as "The Highbury express" during his time at Arsenal, Alan Skiton, he was recognised for his pace and power down the wing, and scored 44 goals for the club in 144 appearances.

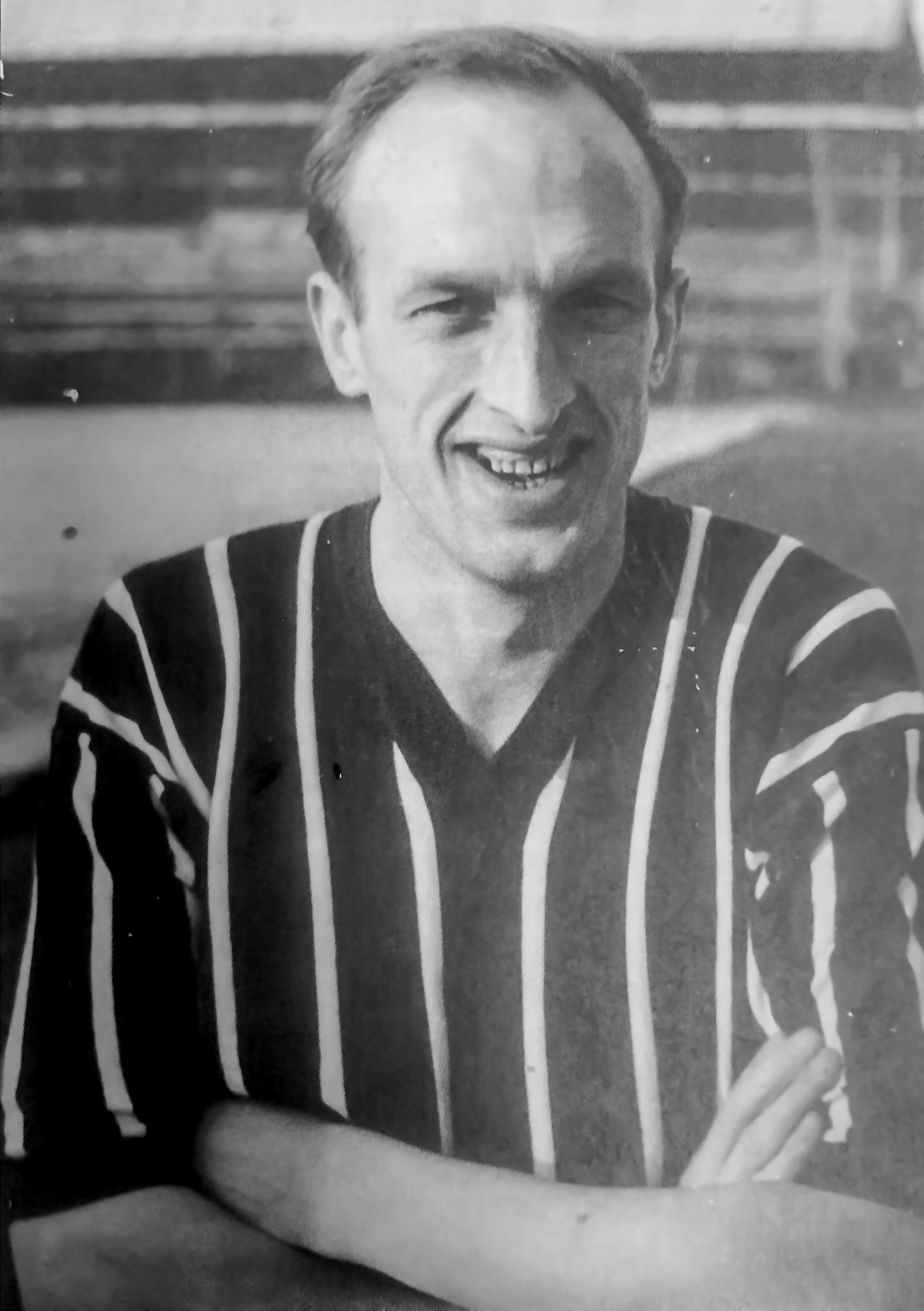
Charlie Fleming, is the club's record goal scorer, with 216 goals.

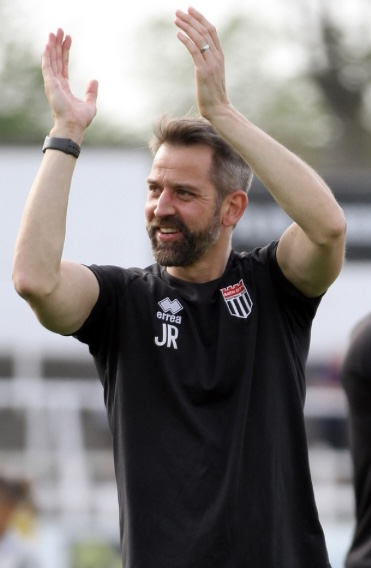
Jim Rollo captained the club to two consecutive promotions in the space of just three years in 2007 and again in 2010, propelling the club back into the top tier of non league football.

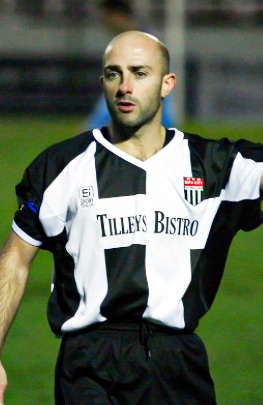
Scott Patridge was described as "an immensely skilful little striker with a wonderful first touch".

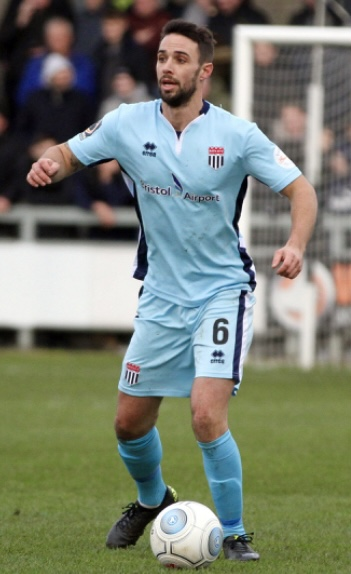
Frankie Artus was the team's main defensive midfielder from 2014-2021.

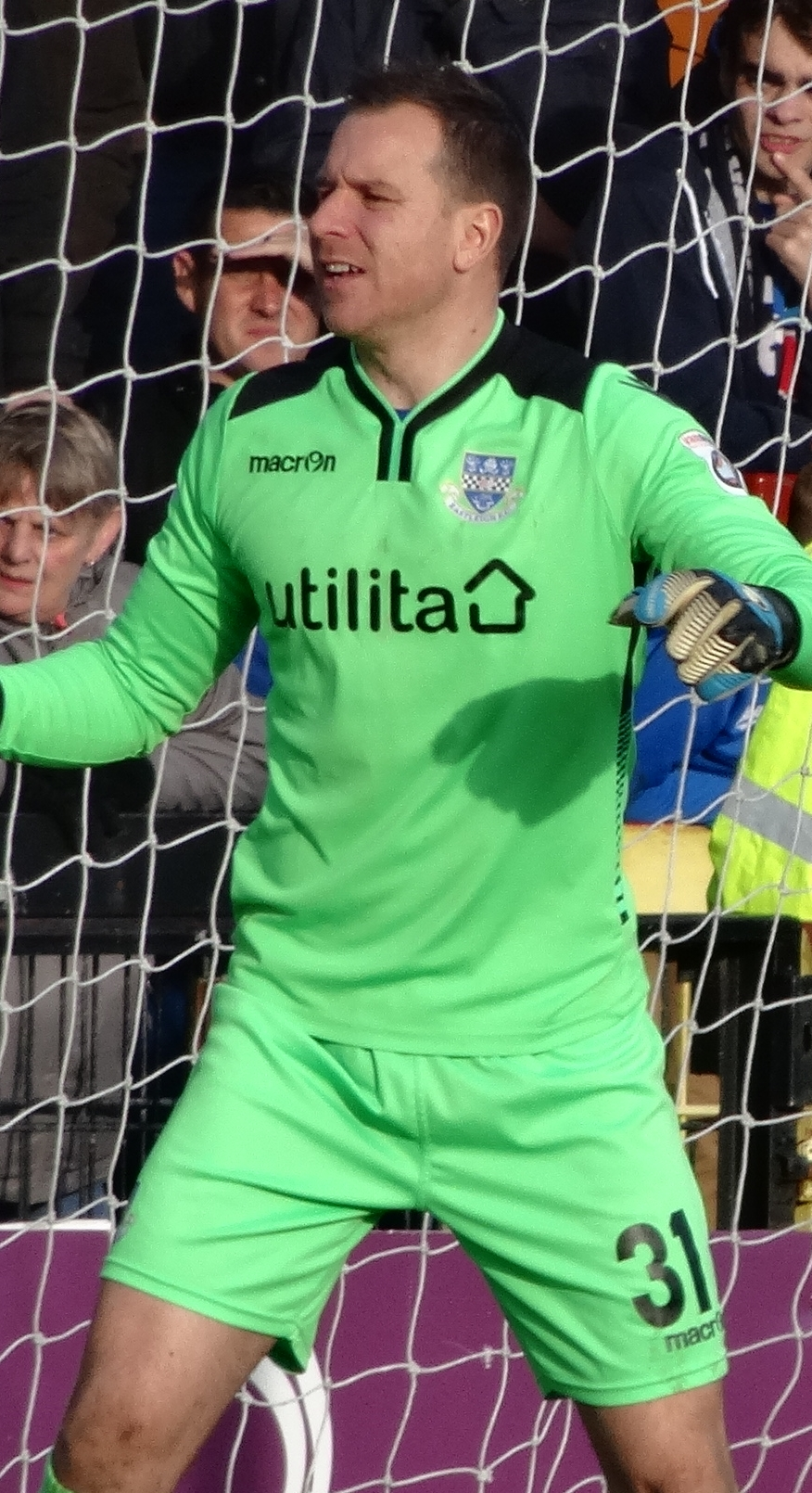
Ryan Clarke made over 100 appearances for the club between 2017 and 2022.
Club Record Holder

Bath players with over 100 appearances
Name	Nationality	Position	Bath City career	Appearances	Goals	Ref
Bert Dumble	England	FW	1912–1915	104	41	
Reg Adams	England	GK	1918–1925	179	41	
William Smith	Scotland	HB	1918–1923	122	13	
Charlie Nuth	England	FB	1918–1937	245	4	
George March	England	FB	1920–1924	138	4	
George Prout	England	GK	1920–1926	277	1	
Harry Brittain	England	FW	1924–1928	133	30	
Ike Long	England	FB	1924–1929	139	5	
Charlie Brittain	England	FW	1924–1928	118	77	
Ernie Sanbridge	England	FB	1926–1935	369	1	
Les Hicks	England	FB	1928–1935	270	18	
Jim McCartney	England	FW	1931–1933	106	48	
Jim Hall	England	FB	1931–1935	212	1	
Jack Lloyd	England	HB	1932–1935	139	9	
George Smith	England	FB	1935–1940	119	15	
Frank Newbury	England	FB	1936–1940	146	1	
Ted Dransfield	England	FB	1937–1940	117	5	
John Browne	Scotland	HB	1945–1948	119	31	
Ted Owens	England	FB	1945–1950	167	4	
Ernie Marshall	England	MF	1948–1951			
Lew Bradford	England	FB	1950–1953	129	2	
Ray Snook	England	FW	1950–1956	176	83	
Harry Liley	England	GK	1951–1956	218	0	
Jackie Boyd	United States	FW	1952–1955	104	42	
Maurice Locker	England	FB	1952–1958	161	2	
Selwyn Watkins	England	FW	1952–1955	149	41	
Bobby McLaren	Scotland	FB	1955–1957	112	6	
Tony Gough	England	HB	1956–1956; 1963–1970	502	50	
Tony Book	England	FB	1956–1964	387	12	
Alan Skirton	England	FW	1956–1960	144	44	
Frank Meadows	England	DF	1957–1962	246	2	
Roger Swift	England	DF	1957–1969	310	1	
Charlie Fleming	Scotland	FW	1958–1965	300	216	
Peter Thomas	Wales	FW	1959–1961	132	36	
Ian Black	Scotland	GK	1959–1962	143	0	
Ian MacFarlane	Scotland	DF	1959–1967	330	4	
Ron Walker	England	FW	1961–1967	249	52	
Brian Carter	England	HB	1961–1968	242	7	
Mike Whitehouse	England	DF	1965–1968	132	3	
Brian McAuley	Scotland	GK	1967–1972	275	0	
Wilf Carter	England	FW	1966–1970	210	46	
John Allen	England	ST	1967–1971	218	76	
Terry Burton	England	DF	1967–1972	258	7	
Tommy Taylor	England	MF	1968–1972	172	4	
Roy Lambden	England	DF	1968–1971	114	2	
Dave Taylor	England	FW	1969–1971	149	46	
John Parker	England	MF	1969–1972	129	10	
Paul Gover	England	DF	1971–1982	398	7	
Nigel Ryan	England	DF	1971–1974; 1976–1980	338	6	
Ray Mabbut	England	DF	1972–1975	113	5	
Kenny Allen	England	GK	1973–1978; 1988–1989	289	0	
Peter Rogers	England	FW	1973–1979	314	70	
John Fairbrother	England	FW	1974–1976	108	60	
Richard Edwards	England	DF	1974–1976	103	14	
Roger Smart	England	DF	1974–1977	123	2	
Martyn Rogers	England	MF	1974–1980	238	12	
Jimmy McInch	Scotland	FW	1975–1977	115	18	
Glyn Broom	England	DF	1975–1981	109	5	
Richard Bourne	England	DF	1976–1979	160	20	
Peter Higgins	England	MF	1976–1979	145	24	
Colin Tavener	England	MF	1976–1981	321	16	
Martin Wheeler	England	FW	1976–1981	242	60	
George Gibbs	England	FW	1977–1979	111	34	
Jimmy Jenkins	England	FW	1978–1982	220	77	
Tony Ricketts	England	DF	1979–1986; 1988–1991	506	19	
Peter Hayes	England	MF	1979–1984	238	23	
Graham Withey	England	FW	1980–1986; 1991–1997	283	109	
Dave Palmer	England	DF	1980–1996	445	23	
Jeff Sherwood	England	DF	1981–1985	250	4	
Keith Brown	England	MF	1981–1986	394	44	
Dave Singleton	England	FW	1981–1993	415	93	
Peter Aitken	England	DF	1982–1985	126	8	
Phil Barton	England	MF	1982–1987	140	7	
Dave Mogg	England	GK	1982–1988; 1992–1997	515	0	
Mike Adams	England	MF	1984–1988	175	22	
Paul Bodin	Wales	FW	1985–1988	284	63	
Paul Stevens	England	DF	1985–1991	215	3	
Chris Smith	England	FW	1988–1991	110	7	
Jim Preston	Scotland	GK	1988–1992	132	0	
Gary Smart	England	MF	1988–1996	293	71	
John Freegard	England	FW	1989–1993	158	75	
Chris Banks	England	DF	1989–1994	259	5	
Paul Randall	England	FW	1989–1993	212	112	
Jerry Gill	England	MF	1990–1996	218	14	
Adie Mings	England	FW	1990–1996	195	36	
Martin Boyle	England	FW	1991–1993	129	27	
Ian Hedges	England	DF	1991–1998	277	12	
Stuart James	England	DF	1993–2000	249	6	
Paul Adcock	England	FW	1993–1996	129	41	
Nicky Brooks	England	MF	1993–1998	140	17	
Mark Hervin	England	GK	1994–1997	192	1	
Mike Wyatt	England	MF	1996–1998	110	12	
Martin Paul	England	FW	1996–2001	277	115	
Mark Harrington	England	MF	1996–2001	215	19	
Rob Skidmore	England	DF	1997–2000	116	2	
Colin Towler	England	DF	1998–2002	248	16	
Jim Rollo	England	DF	2002–2012; 2013–2016	484	9	
Phil Walsh	England	FW	2003–2008	153	28	
Steve Jones	England	DF	2003–2009	242	6	
Scott Partridge	England	FW	2004–2008	170	78	
Paul Evans	South Africa	GK	2004–2009	217	0	
Adie Harris	England	MF	2005–2008	168	8	
Chris Holland	England	DF	2005–2009	207	36	
Gethin Jones	Wales	MF	2005–2013	342	20	
Scott Rogers	England	MF	2006–2009	123	9	
Darren Edwards	England	FW	2006–2010	185	59	
Lewis Hogg	England	MF	2006–2012	239	37	
Sekani Simpson	England	DF	2006–2017	387	5	
Dave Gilroy	England	FW	2007–2009	105	52	
Marc Canham	England	MF	2010–2013	121	11	
Joe Burnell	England	MF	2010–2014	121	3	
Dan Ball	England	DF	2010–2022	247	8	
Mark Preece	England	DF	2011–2014	102	7	
Jason Mellor	England	GK	2012–2015	129	0	
Andy Gallinagh	England	MF	2013–2016	172	3	
David Pratt	England	FW	2013–2016	138	50	
Andy Watkins	England	FW	2013–2019	220	51	
Ross Stearn	England	FW	2013–2015; 2018–2020	180	50	
Scott Wilson	England	FW	2014; 2022–	171	56	
Chas Hemmings	England	FW	2014–2017	130	11	
Nick Mcootie	England	FW	2014–2018	145	33	
Frankie Artus	England	MF	2014–2021	189	16	
Ryan Clarke	England	GK	2017–2022	147	0	
Danny Greenslade	Wales	DF	2016; 2022–	165	2	
Jack Batten	England	DF	2016–	354	16	
Tom Smith	England	MF	2017; 2018–2024	301	52	
Joe Raynes	England	DF	2017–	276	7	
Cody Cooke	England	FW	2020–2024	130	55	
Elliott Frear	England	MF	2021–2025	171	15	
Jordan Dyer	England	DF	2021–2024	120	8	
Kieran Parselle	England	DF	2022–	185	8	
Dan Hayfield	England	MF	2022–2024	108	13	
Luke Russe	England	MF	2023–	119	4	
