= List of Bath City F.C. records and statistics =

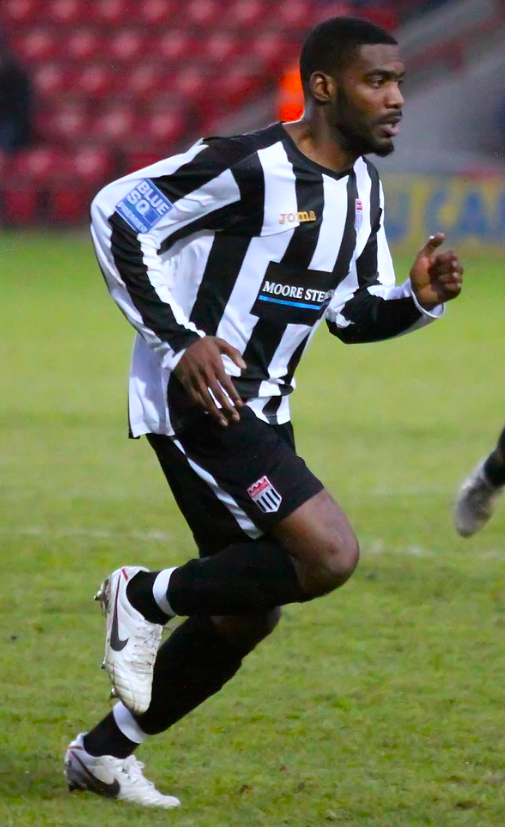
Sekani Simpson made over 380 appearances for Bath City between 2006 and 2017, rising as the tenth most capped player in the clubs entire history.

Bath City Football Club is a semi-professional football club based in Bath, Somerset, England. The club is affiliated to the Somerset FA and currently competes in the National League South, the sixth tier of English football. Nicknamed the "Romans", the club was founded in 1889 as Bath AFC, and changed its name to Bath City in 1905. The team have played their home matches at Twerton Park since 1932. The club spent the first three years of its history in the early 1890s as Bath association football club.

The club was discussed for entry into the Football League Third Division during the 1930s, though Bath has missed out on election to the Football League on multiple occasions, including 1935, 1978 and 1985. This list encompasses the major honours won by Bath City, records set by the club, and awards achieved by the players and managers. The player records section includes details of the club's leading goalscorers and those who have made the most appearances in first-team competitions. The club's record appearance maker is Dave Mogg, who made 515 appearances between 1982 and 1997. Charlie Fleming is the club's record goalscorer, scoring 216 goals in all competitions.

== Honours ==
| Competitions | Titles | Seasons |
|---|---|---|
| Southern League | 3 | 1959–60, 1977–78, 2006–07 |
| Southern League Cup | 1 | 1978–79 |

== Player records ==
=== Top 10 all-time appearances ===
As of 21 December 2020

| Rank | Player | Years | Appearances |
|---|---|---|---|
| 1 | (England) Dave Mogg | 1982–1988, 1992–1997 | 515 |
| 2 | (England) Tony Ricketts | 1979–1996 | 506 |
| 3 | (England) Tony Gough | 1956–1957, 1961–1970, 1972–1974 | 502 |
| 4 | (England) Jim Rollo | 2002–2016 | 484 |
| 5 | (England) Dave Palmer | 1980–1993 | 445 |
| 6 | (England) Dave Singleton | 1981–1993 | 415 |
| 7 | (England) Paul Gover | 1971–1982 | 398 |
| 8 | (England) Keith Brown | 1981–1986, 1989–1993 | 394 |
| 9 | (England) Tony Book | 1956–1964 | 387 |
| 10 | (England) Sekani Simpson | 2006–2017 | 383 |

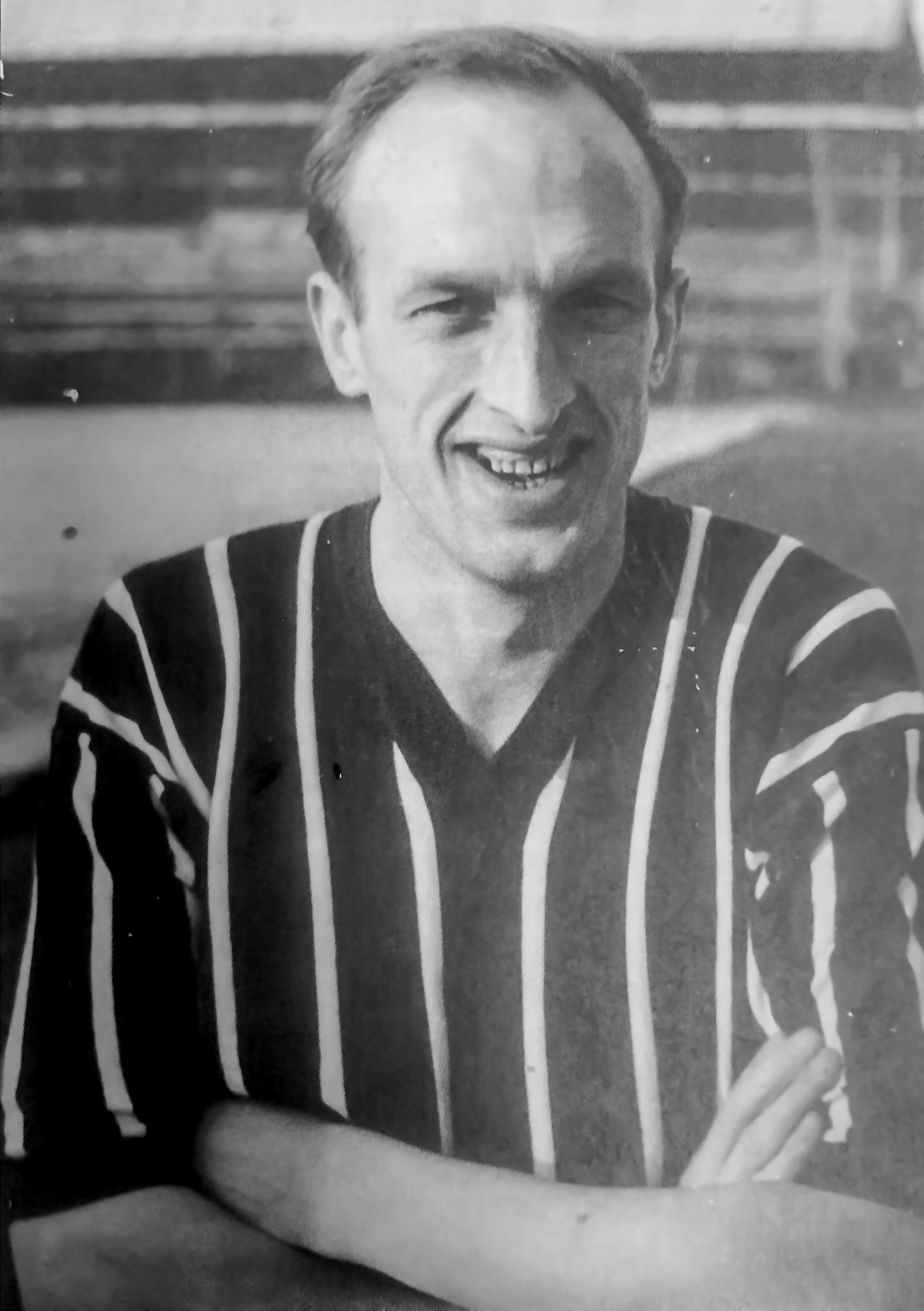
Charlie Fleming is the clubs all time record goal scorer.

=== Goalscorers ===
- Most goals scored (in a season) – 51, Paul Randall (1989–90)
- Most League goals scored (in a season) – 37, Charlie Fleming

=== To all-time scorers ===
As of 21 December 2020

| Rank | Player | Years | Goals |
|---|---|---|---|
| 1 | (Scotland) Charlie Fleming | 1958–1965 | 216 |
| 2 | (England) William Hyman | 1900–1911 | 134 |
| 3 | (England) Martin Paul | 1996–2001, 2007–2008 | 115 |
| 4 | (England) Paul Randall | 1989–1993 | 112 |
| 5 | (England) Graham Withey | 1980–1982, 1986–1988, 1991–1993, 1995–1997 | 109 |
| 6 | (England) Len Pickard | 1955–1958 | 95 |
| 7 | (England) Dave Singleton | 1981–1993 | 93 |
| 8 | (Scotland) Dave McCulloch | 1944–1949 | 88 |
| 9 | (England) Ernie Coombs | 1933–1935 | 84 |

=== Notable former players ===
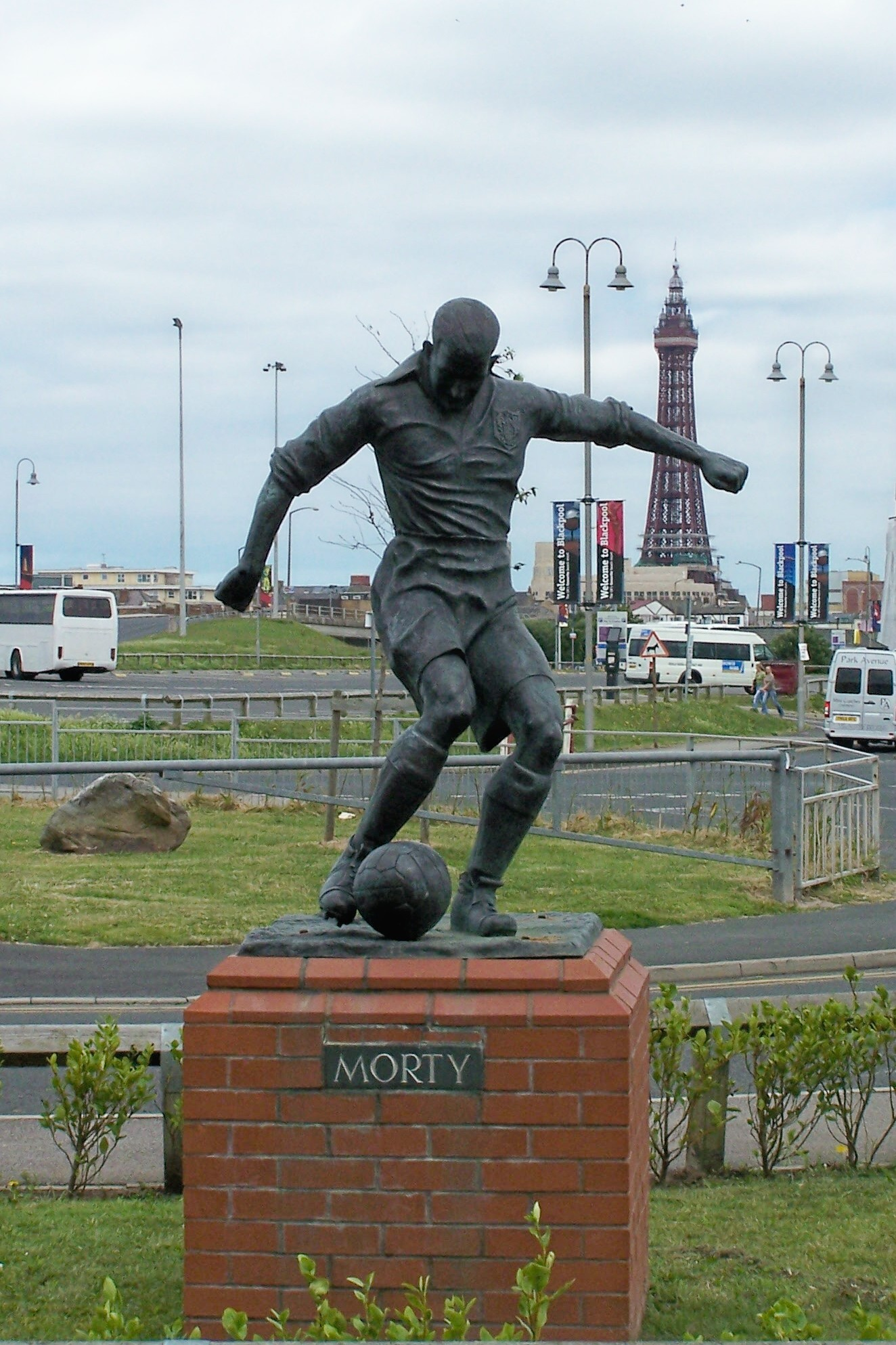
Stan Mortensen statue

Bath City have a long list of notable former players. Players in recent times include the likes of; Bobby Zamora. During the 1950s and 1960s, many players that established themselves in the First Division (now Premier League), stepped out onto the Twerton Park pitch in black and white over 100 times, such players include:

Alan Skirton

Winger, Alan Skirton was born in Bath in 1939. Skirton made 144 appearances for the club between 1956 and 1959, scoring 44 goals. After winning the Southern League with Bath City in 1960, Skirton went on to play for Arsenal, playing for the Gunners over 145 times between 1960 and 1966, scoring 53 goals.

Charle Fleming

Scottish-born striker Charlie Fleming made 107 appearances for the then First Division Sunderland between 1955 and 1958 scoring 60 goals. Known as "Cannonball" for his shooting ability. Fleming moved to Bath in 1958 and scored 206 goals for the Romans until his departure in 1966, making him the club's records goal scorer. After his death in 1997, the bar outside of Twerton Park was renamed; "Charlie's" in his honour.

Ian Black

Goalkeeper Ian Black was born in Scotland in 1924. He joined the then Second Division Southampton in 1947, and played 97 games for them until 1950 – in which year he joined Fulham, playing 263 matches for the Cottagers in both the Second and the First Division in the nine years he was with them. In 1959, Black joined the Romans and helped the club win the 1959–60 Southern League title, Black made over 143 appearances for Bath City until he left in 1962.

Stan Mortensen

Arguably the greatest player to ever play for the club, Stan Mortensen was born in 1921. In 1941, Mortensen joined Blackpool who were one of the best teams in England at the time. He went on to make over 352 appearances for the tangerines, scoring 227 goals, making him Blackpool's second highest goal scorer of all time. In the 1953 FA Cup final Mortensen became the first ever player to score a hat-trick in a FA Cup final at Wembley. Internationally, Mortensen won 25 caps for England, scoring 23 goals. He signed for The Romans for the 1958–59 season, in which he made 40 appearances and scored 27 goals.

Tony Book

Right-back Tony Book was born in Bath in 1938. Book went on to make 385 appearances for the club, captaining Bath to the 1960 Southern League. At the age of 31, he moved to Manchester City and captained them to a First Division, FA Cup, EFL Cup, and UEFA Cup Winners' Cup title, making him their second most decorated captain of all time, after Vincent Kompany.

=== Player of the Season and Golden Boot winners ===
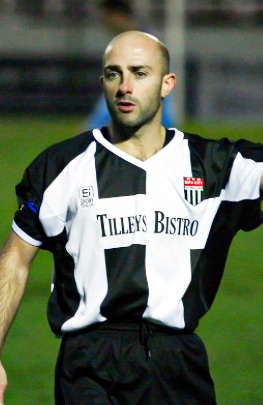
Scott Partridge won the golden boot three times between 2003 and 2007

The following table shows players who have been named the Supporters' Player of the Season and have received the Golden Boot award for scoring the most goals (all competitions) in a season. The table is in chronological order and begins from the 1984–85 season.

| Season | Player of the season | Golden Boot | Goals | Ref. |
|---|---|---|---|---|
| 1984–85 | (England) Dave Mogg | (England) Garry Smith | 16 | |
| 1985–86 | (England) Jeff Sherwood | (England) Dave Singleton | 16 | |
| 1986–87 | (Wales) Paul Bodin | (Wales) Paul Bodin | 27 | |
| 1987–88 | (England) David Craig | (Wales) Paul Bodin | 14 | |
| 1988–89 | (England) Micky Smith | (England) John Freegard | 27 | |
| 1989–90 | (England) Chris Banks | (England) Paul Randall | 51 | |
| 1990–91 | (England) Paul Randall | (England) Paul Randall | 22 | |
| 1991–92 | (England) Ian Hedges | (England) Paul Randall | 26 | |
| 1992–93 | (England) Richard Crowley | (England) Richard Crowley | 13 | |
| 1993–94 | (England) Dave Mogg | (England) Paul Adcock | 23 | |
| 1994–95 | (England) Dave Mogg | (England) Dean Birkby | 19 | |
| 1995–96 | (England) Rob Cousins | (England) Graham Withey | 13 | |
| 1996–97 | (England) Mark Harrington | (England) Mike Davis | 21 | |
| 1997–98 | (England) Ian Hedges | (England) Mike Davis | 23 | |
| 1998–99 | (England) Mike Davis | (England) Martin Paul | 30 | |
| 1999–00 | (England) Colin Towler | (England) Martin Paul | 30 | |
| 2000–01 | (England) Jon Holloway | (England) Martin Paul | 19 | |
| 2001–02 | (England) Gary Thorne | (England) Adrian Foster | 21 | |
| 2002–03 | (Wales) Andy Williams | (England) Jason Eaton | 16 | |
| 2003–04 | (England) Matt Coupe | (England) Scott Partridge | 18 | |

| Season | Player of the season | Golden Boot | Goals | Ref. |
|---|---|---|---|---|
| 2004–05 | (England) Jim Rollo | (England) John Williams | 19 | |
| 2005–06 | (Wales) Gethin Jones | (England) Scott Partridge | 23 | |
| 2006–07 | (England) Chris Holland | (England) Scott Partridge | 18 | |
| 2007–08 | (England) Matt Coupe | (England) Dave Gilroy | 26 | |
| 2008–09 | (England) Chris Holland | (England) Dave Gilroy | 22 | |
| 2009–10 | (England) Adam Connolly (England) Lewis Hogg | (England) Darren Edwards | 25 | |
| 2010–11 | (Portugal) Sido Jombati | (England) Lee Phillips | 16 | |
| 2011–12 | (England) Sekani Simpson | (England) Sean Canham | 11 | |
| 2012–13 | (England) Jason Mellor | (England) Charlie Griffin | 20 | |
| 2013–14 | (England) Dave Pratt | (England) Dave Pratt | 18 | |
| 2014–15 | (England) Dave Pratt | (England) Dave Pratt | 22 | |
| 2015–16 | (England) Dan Ball | (England) Dave Pratt | 10 | |
| 2016–17 | (England) Andy Watkins | (England) Andy Watkins | 14 | |
| 2017–18 | (England) Luke Southwood | (Wales) Jack Compton | 12 | |
| 2018–19 | (England) Robbie Cundy | (England) Ross Stearn | 14 | |
| 2019–20 | (England) Tom Smith | (England) Tom Smith | 17 | |
| 2020–21 | —N/a | —N/a | —N/a | |
| 2021–22 | (England) Alex Fletcher | (England) Cody Cooke | 20 | |
| 2022–23 | (England) Jack Battern | (England) Scott Wilson | 23 | |
| 2023–24 | (England) Luke Russe | (England) Cody Cooke | 18 | |
| 2024–25 | (England) Harvey Wiles-Richards | (England) Scott Wilson | 10 | |

=== Club captains ===
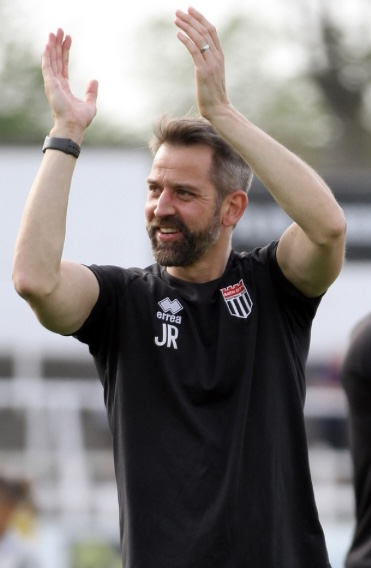
Former club captain, Jim Rollo acted as assistant manager from 2016 to 2021.

The following table shows players who have previously been selected to be club captain. The table is in chronological order and begins from 1958 onwards.

| Name | Period |
|---|---|
| (Scotland) Charlie Fleming | 1958–1961 |
| (Scotland) Ian MacFarlane | 1961–1962 |
| (England) Tony Book | 1962–1964 |
| (Scotland) Ian MacFarlane | 1964–1966 |
| (England) Roger Swift | 1966–1967 |
| (England) Wilf Carter | 1967–1969 |
| (England) Tommy Taylor | 1969–1970 |
| (England) Terry Burt | 1970–1972 |
| (England) Tony Gough | 1972–1974 |
| (England) Paul Gover | 1974–1975 |
| (England) Colin Tavener | 1975–1981 |
| (England) Dave Palmer | 1981–1991 |
| (England) Chris Banks | 1991–1993 |

| Name | Period |
|---|---|
| (England) Nicky Brooks | 1993–1999 |
| (Scotland) Colin Tower | 1999–2002 |
| (England) Gary Thorne | 2003–2004 |
| (England) Steve Jones | 2003–2004 |
| (England) Bobby Ford | 2004–2005 |
| (England) Jim Rollo | 2005–2010 |
| (England) Lewis Hogg | 2010–2011 |
| (England) Gethin Jones | 2011–2013 |
| (England) Andy Gallinagh | 2013–2016 |
| (England) Frankie Artus | 2016–2017 |
| (Grenada) Anthony Straker | 2017–2019 |
| (England) Ryan Clarke | 2019–2022 |
| (England) Kieran Parselle | 2022– |

== Transfers ==
For consistency, fees in the record transfer tables below are all sourced from BBC Sport's contemporary reports of each transfer.

=== Record transfer fees paid ===
Record transfer fees paid by Bath City F.C.
| Rank | Player | From | Fee | Date |
|---|---|---|---|---|
| 1 | (England) Micky Tanner | (England) Bristol City | £16,000 | 1988 |

=== Record transfer fees received ===
Record transfer fees received by Bath City F.C.
| Rank | Player | To | Fee | Date |
|---|---|---|---|---|
| 1 | (England) Jason Dodd | (England) Southampton | £80,000 | 1989 |

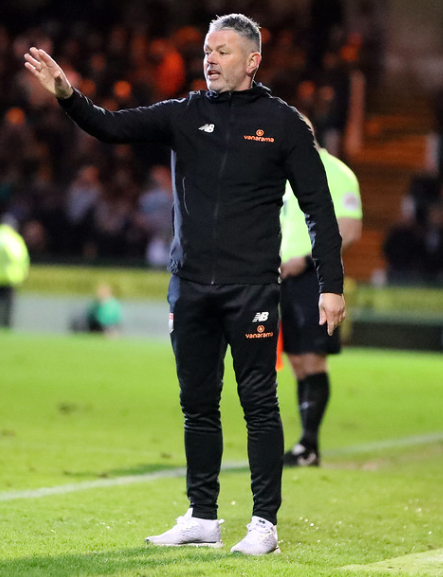
Current manager, Jerry Gill, has been head coach since 2017

== Managerial records ==
- Manager with highest win% ratio: Malcolm Allison with 54% of games won from 1963 to 1964.
- Longest serving manager by time: Ted Davis, from 22 June 1927 to 10 June 1937 and from 4 May 1939 to 3 June 1947 (17 years).

== Team records ==
=== Cup runs ===
- Best FA Cup performance – Third Round (6 times):

vs Brentford (1931–32)
vs Norwich City (1934–35)
vs Brighton & Hove Albion (1959–60)
vs Bolton Wanderers (1963–64)
vs Mansfield Town (1987–88)
vs Stoke City (1993–94)

- Best FA Trophy performance – Semi-finals

vs North Ferriby United (2014–15)

=== Points ===
- Most points in a season:

Two points for a win: 67 in 42 matches, Southern League, 1959–60
Three points for a win: 91 in 42 matches, Southern League, 2007–08

- Fewest points in a season:

Two points for a win: 26 in 42 matches, Southern League, 1971–72
Three points for a win: 31 in 46 matches, National League, 2011–12

=== League position ===
- Highest League position:

4th in the Alliance Premier League (1984–85) (level 5)

- Lowest League position:

6th in the Southern League, (2004–05) (level 7)

=== Goals ===
- Most goals scored in a season: 116: 1959–60 Southern League
- Fewest goals scored in a season: 18: 1934–35 Southern League
- Most goals conceded in a season: 107: 1955–56 Southern League

=== Attendance ===
- Record home gate – 18,020 vs Brighton & Hove Albion, (FA Cup third round, 9 January 1960)
- Record League gate – 17,000 vs Aston Villa, (Football League North, 14 April 1944)
- Record away gate – 26,983 vs Bolton Wanderers, (FA Cup third round, 8 January 1964)
- Record National League South gate – 3,639 vs Yeovil Town (6 December 2023)
- Lowest average attendance – 500 (National League South, 2014–15)
- Highest (recorded) average attendance – 4,940 (Southern League Premier, 1959–60)

=== European record ===
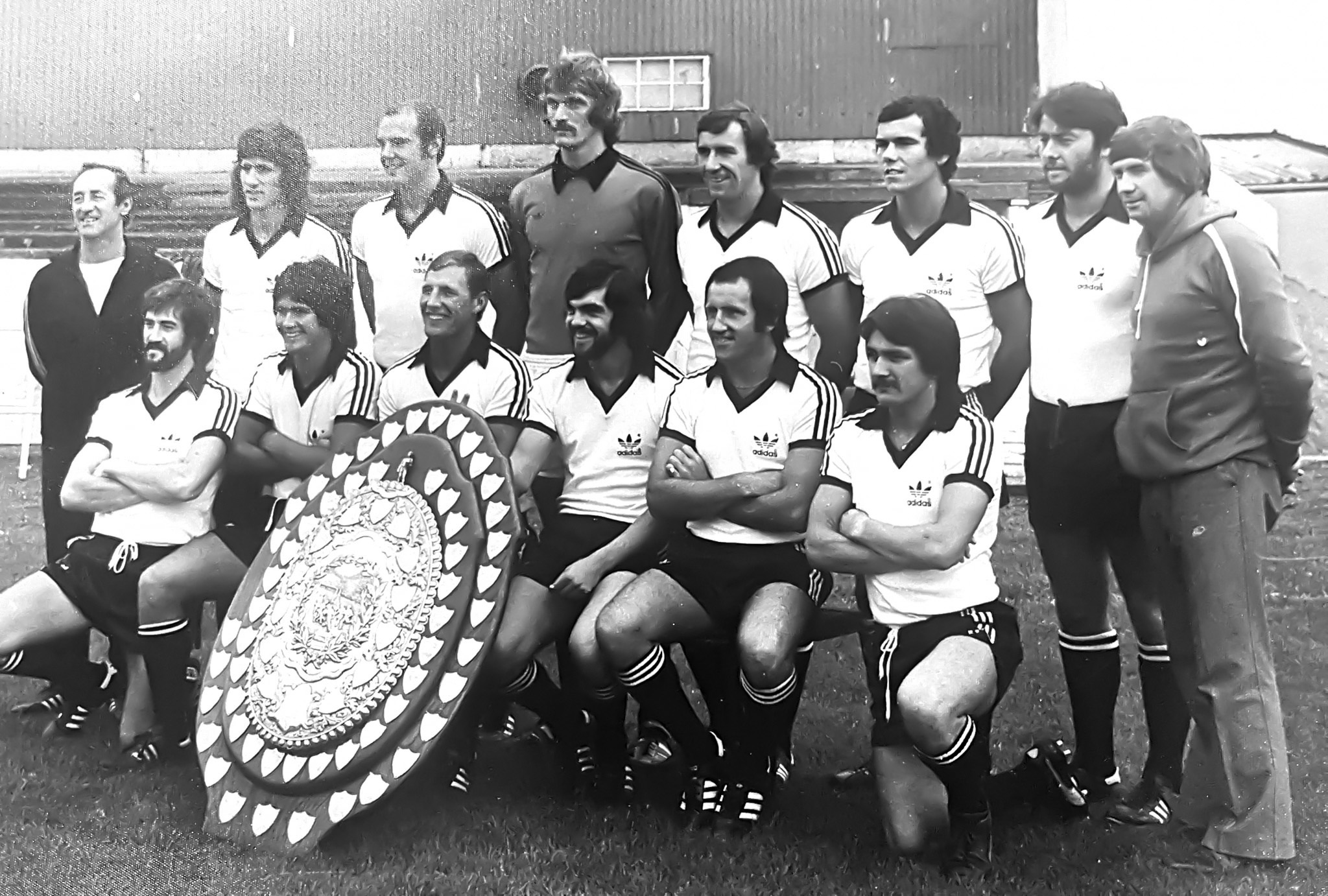
The Bath City team in the late 1970s was the club's only time in competitive European Football.

In 1977 and 1978, Bath City were one of six clubs to represent England in the Anglo-Italian Cup, a now defunct European football competition. They qualified as the English finalist in both tournaments but lost to Lecco (1977) and Udinese (1978) respectively. During the group stage of the 1977 tournament, the club recorded impressive victories over Parma and Bari.

| Season | Competition | Round | Date | Opposition | Home | Away |
|---|---|---|---|---|---|---|
| 1976–77 | Anglo-Italian Cup | First stage | 27 April 1977 | (Italy) Bari | 2–1 | —N/a |
| 1976–77 | Anglo-Italian Cup | First stage | 30 April 1977 | (Italy) Turris | 2–0 | —N/a |
| 1976–77 | Anglo-Italian Cup | Second stage | 22 June 1977 | (Italy) Parma | —N/a | 1–0 |
| 1976–77 | Anglo-Italian Cup | Second stage | 25 June 1977 | (Italy) Teramo | —N/a | 0–4 |
| 1976–77 | Anglo-Italian Cup | Final | 29 June 1977 | (Italy) Lecco | —N/a | 0–3 |
| 1977–78 | Anglo-Italian Cup | First stage | 22 March 1978 | (Italy) Arezzo | 5–0 | —N/a |
| 1977–78 | Anglo-Italian Cup | First stage | 25 March 1978 | (Italy) Paganese | 2–0 | —N/a |
| 1977–78 | Anglo-Italian Cup | Second stage | 20 June 1978 | (Italy) Udinese | —N/a | 1–3 |
| 1977–78 | Anglo-Italian Cup | Second stage | 25 June 1978 | (Italy) Treviso | —N/a | 2–0 |
| 1977–78 | Anglo-Italian Cup | Final | 28 June 1978 | (Italy) Udinese | —N/a | 0–5 |
