= List of Bath City F.C. seasons =

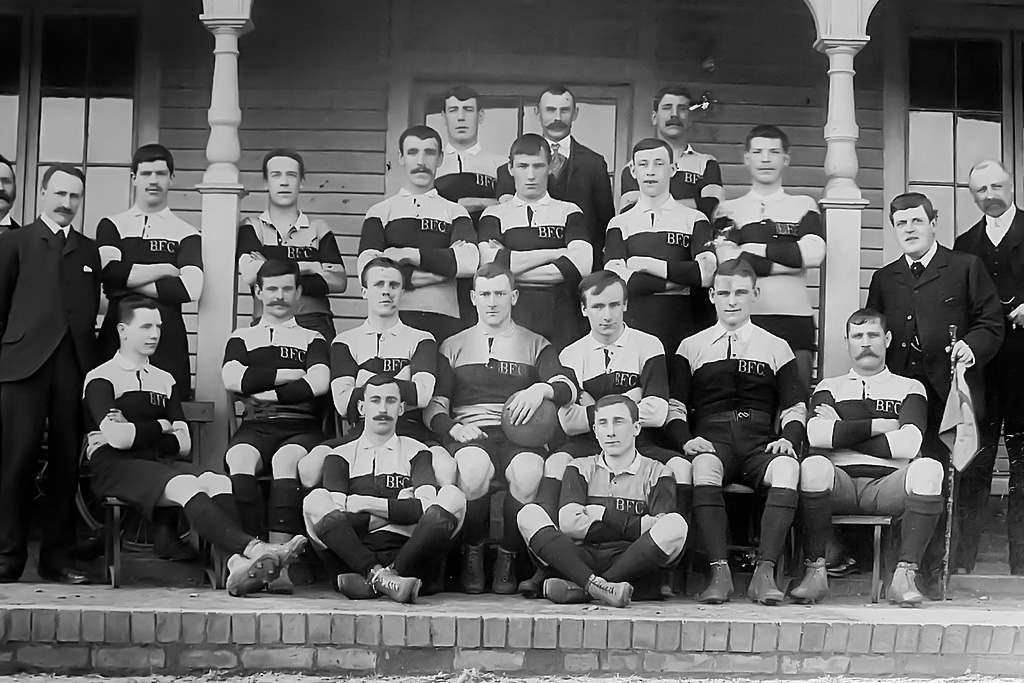
Bath AFC squad photograph in 1890 at the North Parade Ground

Bath City Football Club is a semi-professional football club based in Bath, Somerset, England. The club is affiliated to the Somerset FA and currently competes in the National League South, the sixth tier of English football. Nicknamed the "Romans", the club was founded in 1889 as Bath AFC, and changed its name to Bath City in 1905. Bath City came runners up in the Southern League in 1930, and again in 1933. The club was discussed as a potential entrant to the Football League Third Division South during the 1930s, but missed out on election to the Football League on multiple occasions, including 1935, 1978 and 1985. During the Second World War, the club won the Football League North - competing against the likes of Aston Villa and Bristol City, though wartime trophies were deemed unofficial.

Bath reached the third round of the FA Cup six times, beating league sides such as Crystal Palace (in 1931), Millwall (in 1959), and Cardiff City (in 1992). The club were crowned Southern League champions in 1960 and 1978, one of the highest levels of non-League football at the time. After a period of relative decline in the 1990s while in the Conference, Bath were demoted to the seventh tier in 2004. They were promoted in 2007, and then again in 2010, and played in the Conference for the first time since 1997, though the club were relegated in 2012 and have played in the National League South since. The list details the team's achievements, top goal scorer and attendances in senior first-team competitions from their first in the Wiltshire League during the 1901–02 season to the end of the most recently completed season. Details of the abandoned 1939–40 season and unofficial Second World War leagues are not included.

== Key ==
Key to divisions:

- APL = Alliance Premier League
- BDL = Bath and District League
- BRI 1 = Bristol and District League Division 1
- Conf = Conference
- CP = Conference Premier
- CS = Conference South
- NLS = National League South
- SLP = Southern League Premier Division
- SL 1 = Southern League First Division
- WIL 1 = Wiltshire League Division 1
- WL 1 = Western League Division 1

Key to league record:

- Pld = Matches played
- W = Matches won
- D = Matches drawn
- L = Matches lost
- GF = Goals for
- GA = Goals against
- Pts = Points
- Pos = Final position

Key to rounds:

- F = Final
- QF = Quarter-finals
- QR1 = First qualifying round
- QR2 = Second qualifying round
- QR3 = Third qualifying round
- QR4 = Fourth qualifying round
- R1 = Round 1
- R2 = Round 2
- R3 = Round 3
- R4 = Round 4
- R5 = Round 5
- R6 = Round 6
- SF = Semi-finals

Winners	Runners-up	Promoted ↑	Relegated ↓

== Seasons ==
Correct as of the end of the 2025–26 season.

Seasons of Bath City F.C.
Season	League										FA Cup	FA Trophy (Note: The FA Trophy was not established until the 1969–70 season.)	League Cup (Note: Includes the Southern League Cup and Conference League Cup)	Top goalscorer(s) (Note: Goals in Alliance Premier League/National League, National League South, FA Trophy, FA Cup, Southern League, Somerset Premier Cup and Western League are counted.)		Average attendance (Note: Only League matches are counted (Southern League, Alliance Premier League/Conference, National League South). But Cup fixtures, Western League and friendly matches are excluded. Sourced from "The Stars in Stripes", Kerry Miller 2003 and The Bath City Archive, taken from the 1967–68 season up to the most recent season.)	Ref
Season	Division	Tier	P	W	D	L	GF	GA	Pts	Pos	FA Cup	FA Trophy	League Cup	Player(s)	Goals	Average attendance	Ref
1901–02	WIL	–	16	5	2	9	21	37	12	7th	–	–	–	–	–	–	
1902–03	BDL	–	–	–	–	–	–	–	–	–	–	–	–	–	–	–	
1903–04	WIL	–	20	4	1	15	21	89	9	10th	–	–	–	–	–	–	
1904–05	WIL 1	–	20	10	1	9	49	41	21	5th	–	–	–	–	–	–	
1905–06	WIL 1	–	22	7	3	12	35	47	17	9th	–	–	–	–	–	–	
1906–07	BRI 1	–	22	8	5	8	36	27	19	8th	–	–	–	–	–	–	
1907–08	BRI 1	–	–	–	–	–	–	–	–	–	–	–	–	–	–	–	
1908–09	WL 2	–	22	6	7	9	39	45	19	8th	QR3	–	–	–	–	–	
1909–10	WL 1	–	24	5	6	13	31	66	15	9th	QR1	–	–	–	–	–	
1910–11	WL 1	–	18	9	4	5	38	30	22	3rd	QR1	–	–	Tom Allen	13	–	
1911–12	WL 1	–	20	10	2	8	31	27	22	9th	QR1	–	–	Tom Allen	12	–	
1912–13	WL 1	–	22	13	1	8	52	35	27	4th	QR1	–	–	Bert Lovell	23	–	
1913–14	WL 1	–	22	17	2	3	67	34	36	2nd	QR4	–	–	Charlie Gould	23	–	
Competitive football suspended for the duration of World War I
1919–20	WL 1	–	18	8	2	8	48	29	18	5th	QR4	–	–	Jack Hill	19	–	
1920–21	WL 1	–	30	12	7	11	45	45	31	8th	QR1	–	–	Joe Dailmore	31	–	
1921–22	SL (Note: Bath were elected into the Southern League in 1921. From 1920 to 1958, it was one of, if not the highest level of non-league football.)	–	36	16	5	15	55	53	37	11th	QR5	–	–	Percy Dore	32	–	
1922–23	SL	–	38	10	8	20	44	71	28	15th	R1	–	–	Percy Bolston	16	–	
1923–24	SL	–	34	6	9	19	32	17	21	16th	QR1	–	–	Jim Lawson	10	–	
1924–25	SL	–	38	8	8	22	28	85	24	18th	QR1	–	–	Percy Bolston	7	–	
1925–26	SL	–	26	7	1	18	38	86	15	14th	R2	–	–	Bill Graydon	13	–	
1926–27	SL	–	26	7	9	10	44	52	23	11th	QR1	–	–	Bill Graydon	25	–	
1927–28	SL	–	30	12	3	15	64	68	27	11th	QR1	–	–	Bill Graydon	29	–	
1928–29	SL	–	26	13	4	9	61	59	30	6th	QR1	–	–	Charlie Brittain	46	–	
1929–30	SL	–	28	16	6	6	85	52	38	1st (Note: Though the club finished first, they lost the Southern League final to Eastern Section champions Aldershot, and thus did not win the title.)	R2	–	–	Charlie Brittain	31	–	
1930–31	SL	–	22	10	6	6	47	39	26	5th	QR3	–	–	Jim McCartney	28	–	
1931–32	SL	–	24	12	7	5	50	33	31	3rd	R3	–	–	Ernie Coombs	37	–	
1932–33	SL	–	20	13	4	3	62	34	30	1st (Note: Though the club finished first, they lost the Southern League final for a second time, losing to Eastern Section champions Norwich City reserves and thus did not win the title.)	QR4	–	SF	Wilf Lewis	26	–	
1933–34	SL	–	20	11	3	6	43	25	25	3rd	R1	–	QR	Trotman	44	–	
1934–35	SL	–	16	6	4	6	35	32	16	5th	R3	–	R1	Ernie Coombs	26	–	
1935–36	SL	–	16	5	5	6	18	26	15	5th	QR4	–	R2	Reg Weaver	37	–	
1936–37	SL	–	30	15	5	10	66	52	35	4th	R1	–	R2	Ted Buckley	28	–	
1937–38	SL	–	32	9	9	16	45	65	27	14th	QR4	–	R2	Bill Brown	13	–	
1938–39	SL	–	44	16	12	16	58	74	44	11th	QR4	–	R2	Bill Chambers	32	–	
Competitive football suspended for the duration of World War II
1945–46	SL	–	20	12	2	6	62	32	34	3rd	QR2	–	R3	Bob Farrington	20	–	
1946–47	SL	–	32	7	7	18	52	93	21	16th	QR4	–	R3	Stan Merrit	22	2,126	
1947–48	SL	–	34	12	8	14	55	62	32	11th	QR4	–	R3	Dave McCulloch	27	2,932	
1948–49	SL	–	42	15	8	19	72	87	38	13th	QR4	–	R2	Dave McCulloch	48	–	
1949–50	SL	–	46	16	7	23	61	78	39	17th	QR1	–	RU	Kelly	19	–	
1950–51	SL	–	44	15	10	19	66	73	40	15th	QR1	–	QR	Bert Hawkins	22	–	
1951–52	SL	–	42	19	6	17	75	67	44	10th	QR4	–	R1	Ray Snook	34	4,107	
1952–53	SL	–	42	22	10	10	71	46	54	5th	R2	–	R1	Jackie Boyd	27		
1953–54	SL	–	42	17	12	13	73	67	46	4th	R1	–	R1	Cliff Pinchbeck	23	–	
1954–55	SL	–	42	18	9	15	73	80	45	9th	QR4	–	R1	Eric Marsden	21	–	
1955–56	SL	–	42	7	10	25	43	107	24	22nd	QR2	–	QR	Selwyn Watkins	12	–	
1956–57	SL	–	42	15	8	19	56	78	38	17th	QR1	–	R2	Len Pickard	32	–	
1957–58	SL	–	42	13	9	20	65	64	35	16th	R2	–	R1	Len Pickard	45	–	
1958–59	SLP	–	34	17	5	12	89	62	39	6th	R1	–	RU	Charlie Fleming	48	4,333	
1959–60	SLP	–	42	32	3	7	116	50	67	1st (Note: Though the club won one of the highest quality leagues within non-league football, they missed out on election to the Football League.)	R3	–	R2	Charlie Fleming	47	4,940	
1960–61	SLP	–	42	18	14	10	74	52	50	6th	R1	–	R2	Charlie Fleming	40	2,902	
1961–62	SLP	–	42	25	7	10	102	70	57	2nd	QR4	–	R2	Neil Langman	31	3,095	
1962–63	SLP	–	40	18	6	16	58	56	42	10th	QR4	–	R2	Ken Owens	16	2,316	
1963–64	SLP	–	42	24	9	9	88	51	57	3rd	R3	–	R2	Charlie Fleming	32	2,993	
1964–65	SLP ↓	–	42	13	3	26	60	86	29	22nd	R1	–	R2	Mike Denton	16	1,910	
1965–66	SL 1 ↑	–	46	25	13	8	88	50	63	4th	R2	–	R4	Mike Denton	41	2,030	
1966–67	SLP ↓	–	42	11	12	19	51	74	30	19th	R2	–	R3	Mike Denton	18	2,191	
1967–68	SL 1	–	42	21	12	9	78	51	54	6th	QR4	–	R2	Ian Henderson	34	2,076	
1968–69	SLP ↑	–	42	26	10	6	96	40	62	2nd	QR4	–	R2	John Allen	34	2,151	
1969–70	SLP	–	42	18	8	16	63	55	44	11th	QR3	R1	QR	Brian Owen	34	1,831	
1970–71	SLP	–	42	13	12	17	48	68	38	15th	QR3	QR3	R3	Dave Taylor	16	1,239	
1971–72	SLP ↓	–	42	11	4	27	45	86	26	20th	QR2	QR2	R1	John Mitten	19	1,308	
1972–73	SL 1	–	42	18	11	13	56	54	47	7th	QR1	R1	R2	Colin Norman	33	1,229	
1973–74	SL 1 ↑	–	38	20	8	10	55	35	48	2nd	QR2	QR3	R2	Pete Harman	13	1,309	
1974–75	SLP	–	42	20	8	14	63	50	48	6th	R1	QR3	R3	John Fairbrother	19	–	
1975–76	SLP	–	42	11	16	15	62	57	38	16th	QR1	QR1	R1	John Fairbrother	41	867	
1976–77	SLP	–	42	20	15	7	51	30	55	4th	QR4	R1	R2	Kevin Griffin	16	1,134	
1977–78	SLP	–	42	22	18	2	83	32	62	1st (Note: Bath's closest chance of gaining entry into the Football League, gaining 23 votes, 3 votes short of Wigan Athletic who were admitted into the FL.)	R1	QR3	R1	George Gibbs	21	1,611	
1978–79	SLP	–	42	17	19	6	55	35	53	5th	QR4	R1	W	Peter Rodgers	11	1,060	
1979–80	APL (Note: The clubs first time playing nation-wide football within the English Football Pyramid)	5	38	10	12	16	43	69	32	16th	QR1	R3	R1	Martin Wheeler	12	970	
1980–81	APL	5	38	16	10	12	61	32	42	6th	QR4	R1	R3	Graham Withey	18	898	
1981–82	APL	5	42	15	10	17	50	57	55 (Note: The 1981–82 season saw the introduction of three points for a win.)	12th	QR2	R1	R1	Graham Withey	16	888	
1982–83	APL	5	42	17	9	16	51	42	60	10th	QR3	R1	R2	Dave Singleton	22	738	
1983–84	APL	5	42	17	12	13	60	48	53	6th	QR2	R2	R1	Gary Smith	16	635	
1984–85	APL	5	42	21	9	12	63	47	57	4th (Note: Bath's highest ever league finish)	QR3	R3	R1	Gary Smith	16	651	
1985–86	APL	5	42	13	11	18	53	54	45	12th	R2	R1	R1	Dave Singleton	16	549	
1986–87	Conf	5	42	17	12	13	63	62	63	10th	R2	R2	R1	Paul Bodin	27	501	
1987–88	Conf ↓	5	42	9	10	23	48	76	37	20th	R3	R2	R3	Paul Bodin	14	596	
1988–89	SLP	6	42	15	13	14	66	51	58	9th	R2	R1	R2	John Freegard	27	560	
1989–90	SLP ↑	6	42	30	8	4	81	28	98	2nd	R1	R1	R3	Paul Randall	51	660	
1990–91	Conf	5	42	10	12	20	55	61	42	20th	QR4	R3	R1	Paul Randall	22	882	
1991–92	Conf	5	42	16	12	14	54	51	60	9th	QR3	R3	R1	Paul Randall	26	706	
1992–93	Conf	5	42	15	14	13	63	56	59	7th	R2	R1	R1	Richard Crowley	13	637	
1993–94	Conf	5	42	13	17	12	47	38	56	12th	R3	R2	R2	Paul Adcock	23	653	
1994–95	Conf	5	42	15	12	15	55	56	57	12th	R1	R1	R2	Dean Birky	19	646	
1995–96	Conf	5	42	13	7	24	45	66	46	18th	QR4	R1	R1	Graham Withey	13	515	
1996–97	Conf ↓	5	42	12	11	19	39	53	47	20th	QR4	R2	R1	Mike Davis	21	689	
1997–98	SLP	6	42	19	12	11	72	51	69	6th	QR4	R2	R2	Mike Davis	23	670	
1998–99	SLP	6	42	18	11	13	70	44	65	4th	QR4	R3	R2	Martin Paul	30	793	
1999–00	SLP	6	42	19	15	8	70	49	72	4th	R1	R1	QR	Martin Paul	30	993	
2000–01	SLP	6	42	15	13	14	67	68	55	15th	QR4	R2	R2	Martin Paul	19	812	
2001–02	SLP	6	42	13	11	18	56	65	50	17th	QR2	R2	R3	Adrian Foster	21	850	
2002–03	SLP	6	42	13	13	16	50	61	52	14th	QR4	R3	R1	Jason Eaton	16	866	
2003–04	SLP	6	42	13	12	17	49	57	51	16th (Note: With the formation of the Conference South in 2004, the Southern League was demoted to the seventh tier, as a result, Bath moved down one division in the football pyramid, albeit without being relegated. Subsequently, the club ended up playing some of the lowest tier football in the club's history from 2004 to 2007.)	QR3	R3	R4	Scott Partridge	18	714	
2004–05	SLP	7	42	19	12	11	57	43	69	6th	R2	R3	R3	John Williams	19	616	
2005–06	SLP	7	42	25	8	9	66	33	83	2nd	QR3	QR3	R4	Scott Partridge	23	732	
2006–07	SLP ↑	7	42	27	10	5	84	29	91	1st	QR2	R1	R4	Scott Partridge	18	930	
2007–08	CS	6	42	10	8	3	30	59	36	8th	QR4	R1	R2	Dave Gilroy	26	851	
2008–09	CS	6	42	20	8	14	56	45	68	8th	QR3	R1	R3	Dave Gilroy	22	618	
2009–10	CS ↑	6	42	20	12	10	66	46	72	4th	R1	QR3	–	Darren Edwards	25	965	
2010–11	CP	5	46	16	15	15	64	68	63	10th	QR4	R2	–	Lee Phillips	16	1,053	
2011–12	CP ↓	5	46	7	10	29	43	89	31	23rd	R1	R3	–	Sean Canham	11	848	
2012–13	NLS	6	42	15	10	17	60	58	55	11th	QR3	R1	–	Charlie Griffin	20	583	
2013–14	NLS	6	42	18	12	12	63	38	66	7th	QR4	QR3	–	David Pratt	18	599	
2014–15	NLS	6	40	15	8	17	59	57	53	14th	QR4	SF	–	David Pratt	22	500	
2015–16	NLS	6	42	14	11	17	50	61	53	14th	QR3	R1	–	David Pratt	10	727	
2016–17	NLS	6	42	18	8	16	71	52	62	9th	QR3	QR3	–	Andy Waltkins	14	612	
2017–18	NLS	6	42	17	12	13	64	48	63	9th	QR4	R1	–	Jack Compton	12	702	
2018–19	NLS	6	42	20	11	11	58	36	71	5th	QR4	R1	–	Ross Stearn	14	1,142	
2019–20	NLS	6	35	18	9	8	50	37	63	4th	QR4	R1	–	Tom Smith	17	1,081	
2020–21	NLS	6	13	4	1	21	15	23	13	18th	QR3	R1	–	Tommy Conway	9	–	
2021–22	NLS	6	40	13	6	21	45	68	45	18th	QR4	R4	–	Cody Cooke	20	1,204	
2022–23	NLS	6	46	19	10	17	64	57	67	11th	QR3	R3	–	Scott Wilson	23	1,116	
2023–24	NLS	6	46	20	13	13	69	51	73	6th	QR4	R4	–	Cody Cooke	18	1,495	
2024–25	NLS	6	46	15	12	19	47	48	57	15th	QR4	R2	–	Scott Wilson	10	1,265	
2025–26	NLS ↓	6	46	10	13	23	50	77	43	21st	QR2	R4	–	Jordan Alves	9	1,142	
