= James Rollo =

James Rollo may refer to:

- Jim Rollo (1937–2012), Scottish professional footballer
- Jimmy Rollo (born 1976), English professional footballer
- James Rollo, 2nd Lord Rollo (1600–1669), Scottish aristocrat
- James Rollo, 7th Lord Rollo (1738–1784), Scottish aristocrat
