= Bill Thompson (Scottish footballer) =

Scottish footballer and manager (1921–1986)

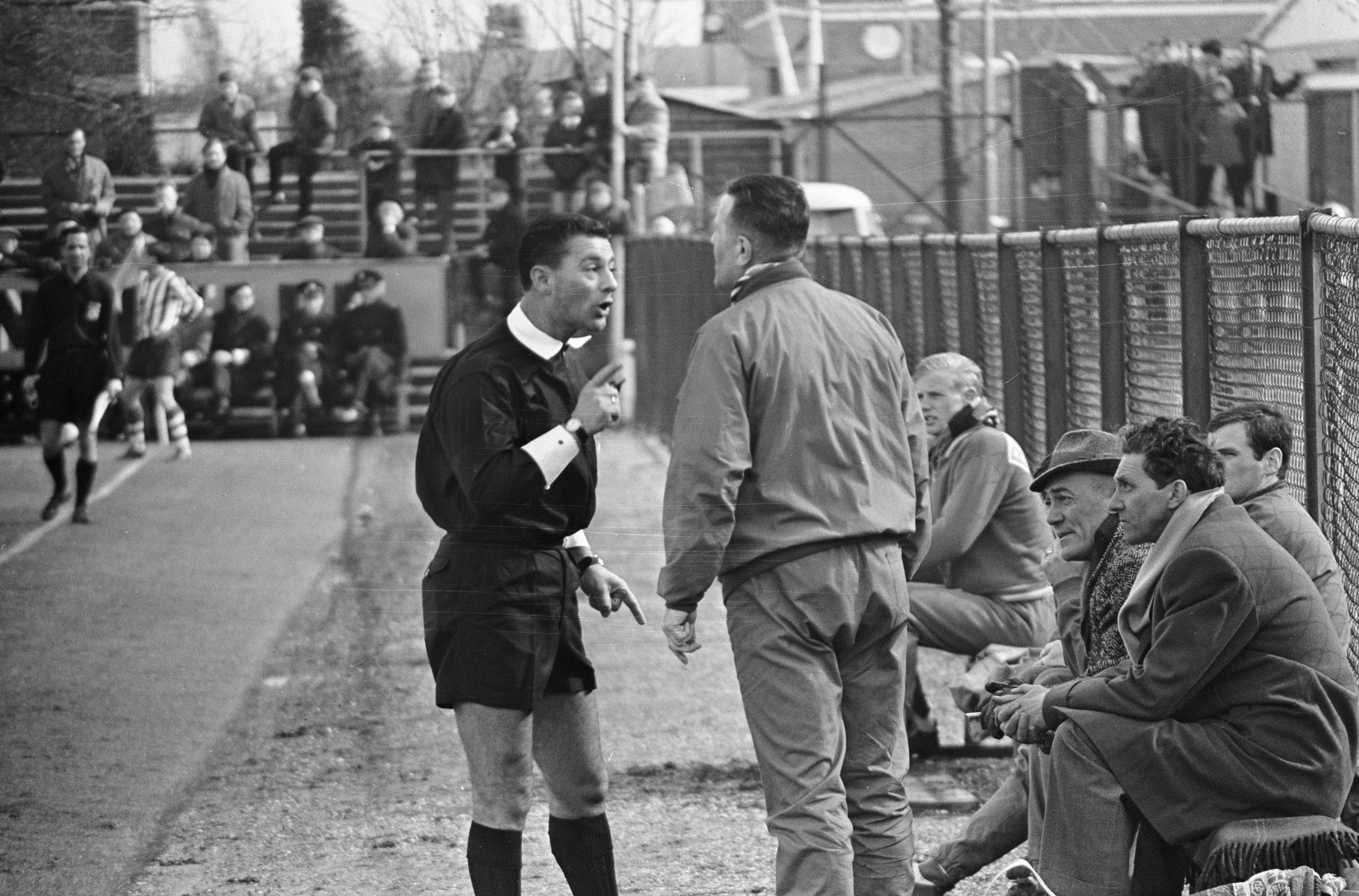
- Thompson arguing with Dutch referee Brouwer (1966)

Personal information
- Full name: William Gordon Thompson
- Date of birth: 10 August 1921
- Place of birth: Glasgow, Scotland
- Date of death: 26 December 1986 (aged 65)
- Place of death: Portsmouth, England
- Position: Wing half

Senior career*
Years	Team	Apps	(Gls)
–	Carnoustie Panmure		
1948–1952	Portsmouth	20	(2)
1952–1954	Bournemouth & Boscombe Athletic	45	(0)
–	Guildford City		

Managerial career
- 1956–1957: Guildford City
- 1957–1958: Exeter City
- 1958–1962: Worcester City
- 1963–1966: Sparta Rotterdam
- 1970–1971: HFC Haarlem
- * Club domestic league appearances and goals

William Gordon Thompson (10 August 1921 – 26 December 1986) was a Scottish footballer who played in the Football League as a wing half for Portsmouth and Bournemouth & Boscombe Athletic. He went on to manage clubs in England and the Netherlands.

== Life and career ==
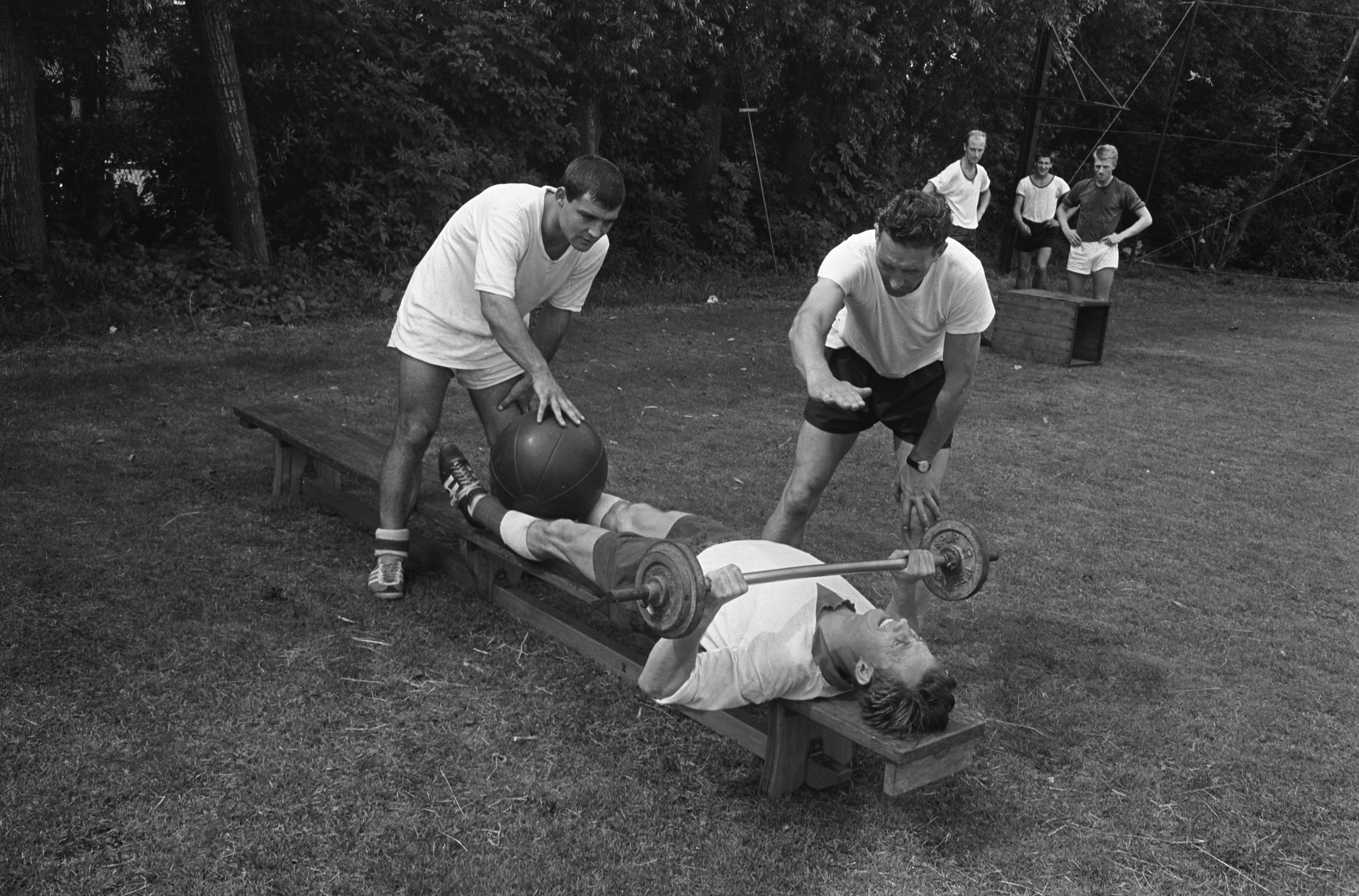
Thompson (black shorts) manager with Sparta Rotterdam (1965)

Born in Glasgow, Thompson played for Scottish junior club Carnoustie Panmure before joining Portsmouth. He was a member of Portsmouth's championship-winning team of 1949 and 1950. His only goals for the club came on the last day of the 1949–50 season, playing as an emergency centre-forward. Needing to beat Aston Villa to ensure they stayed ahead of Wolverhampton Wanderers on goal average, Thompson scored twice in a 5–1 win. He went on to play in the League for Bournemouth & Boscombe Athletic and in non-league football for Guildford City.

Thompson took over as manager of Guildford City towards the end of the 1955–56 Southern League season, in which they won the title. In May 1957, he was the pick of more than thirty applicants for the post of manager at Third Division South club Exeter City, but lasted only until January 1958, when the club announced his departure by mutual agreement, though Thompson himself said he had been sacked. A few days later, he was appointed manager of Southern League Worcester City, leading them to victory against Liverpool in the 1958–59 FA Cup and remaining in post until 1962.

He went on to coach abroad, including in the Netherlands with Sparta Rotterdam from 1963 to 1966 and HFC Haarlem from 1970 to 1971.

== Honours ==
Portsmouth

- Football League First Division: 1948–49, 1949–50
- FA Charity Shield: 1949

Guildford City

- Southern League Premier Division: 1955–56

Sparta Rotterdam

- KNVB Cup: 1965–66
