= Mike Hooper (footballer) =

English footballer

Personal information
- Full name: Michael Dudley Hooper
- Date of birth: 10 February 1964 (age 62)
- Place of birth: Bristol, England
- Height: 6 ft 3 in (1.91 m)
- Position: Goalkeeper

Youth career
- Mangotsfield United

Senior career*
Years	Team	Apps	(Gls)
1983–1985	Bristol City	1	(0)
1985	Wrexham	34	(0)
1985–1993	Liverpool	51	(0)
1990	→ Leicester City (loan)	14	(0)
1993–1996	Newcastle United	25	(0)
1995	→ Sunderland (loan)	0	(0)
Total		125	(0)
- * Club domestic league appearances and goals

Michael Dudley Hooper (born 10 February 1964) is an English former professional footballer who played as a goalkeeper.

As a player, he notably played in the Premier League for both Liverpool and Newcastle United, although most of his time at both clubs saw him operate as second choice behind the likes of Bruce Grobbelaar and Pavel Srnicek. He also played in the Football League for Bristol City, Wrexham, Leicester City and Sunderland.

== Early life ==
Hooper attended Glenfrome Junior School. As goalkeeper for the school team, his towering height proved an imposing sight to the opposition. He later attended Lockleaze Comprehensive School and played as goalkeeper in the same school team as fellow future professional footballers Gary Smart, Gary Penrice and Ian Holloway, who were all roughly the same age.

Hooper received a first class degree in English Literature at Swansea University.

== Club career ==
Having started his professional career at Bristol City in 1983, and tasting regular senior football after signing for Wrexham in the 1984-85 season, Hooper was signed by newly appointed Liverpool player-manager Kenny Dalglish for the 1985-86 season. His debut for Liverpool came in the 1986 FA Charity Shield as a substitute for Bruce Grobbelaar. He was at Anfield for eight years, during which time the club won six major trophies, but his first team opportunities were limited by the presence of Grobbelaar, his only real opportunities of first team football coming in 1988–89 when Grobbelaar missed 17 league games through illness, but when Grobbelaar recovered Hooper was back in the reserves. The arrival of David James in 1992 made his first team chances look even slimmer.

On 23 September 1993 Hooper signed for Newcastle United, who had recently been promoted to the Premier League, making his debut two days later with a clean sheet against West Ham. Again, his first team opportunities were restricted, this time by Pavel Srnicek, and he was loaned out to neighbours Sunderland in 1994–95 to gain more first team opportunities, although he did not play a first team game for them.

His fate was sealed when he was caught on camera openly laughing, whilst on the bench, after Newcastle had conceded a goal. He never played senior football again. The signing of Shaka Hislop confirmed this and left Hooper with little hope of even a place on the Newcastle bench during the 1995–96 season, but he remained at the club until the end of his contract in the summer of 1996 and finally left on a free transfer.

== Personal life ==
Mike Hooper is the great-great-grandson of Frank Bacon, a one-time director of Bristol City, and the great-great-grandnephew of Canadian politician and King's Printer, Herbert Henry Ball. He has two children.

He has since worked as a nightclub bouncer in County Durham.

== Honours ==
Liverpool

- FA Charity Shield: 1986, 1988, 1989, 1990
- Screen Sport Super Cup: 1986
