= Gethin Jones (disambiguation) =

Gethin Jones (born 1978) is a Welsh television presenter.

Gethin Jones may also refer to:

- Gethin Jones (footballer, born 1981), Welsh football defender
- Gethin Jones (soccer, born 1995), Australian football defender
