= 1953–54 Southern Football League =

The 1953–54 Southern Football League season was the 51st in the history of the league, an English football competition.

No new clubs had joined the league for this season so the league consisted of 22 clubs from previous season. Merthyr Tydfil were champions, winning their fifth Southern League title. Four Southern League clubs applied to join the Football League at the end of the season, but none were successful.

== Final table ==
Southern Football League
- Season: 1953–54
- Champions: Merthyr Tydfil
- Matches: 462
- Goals: 1,582 (3.42 per match)

Pos	Team	Pld	W	D	L	GF	GA	GR	Pts
1	Merthyr Tydfil	42	27	8	7	97	55	1.764	62
2	Headington United	42	22	9	11	68	43	1.581	53
3	Yeovil Town	42	20	8	14	87	76	1.145	48
4	Bath City	42	17	12	13	73	67	1.090	46
5	Kidderminster Harriers	42	18	9	15	62	59	1.051	45
6	Weymouth	42	18	8	16	83	72	1.153	44
7	Barry Town	42	17	9	16	108	91	1.187	43
8	Bedford Town	42	19	5	18	80	84	0.952	43
9	Gloucester City	42	16	11	15	69	77	0.896	43
10	Hastings United	42	16	10	16	73	67	1.090	42
11	Kettering Town	42	15	12	15	65	63	1.032	42
12	Hereford United	42	16	9	17	66	62	1.065	41
13	Llanelly	42	16	9	17	80	85	0.941	41
14	Guildford City	42	15	11	16	56	60	0.933	41
15	Gravesend & Northfleet	42	16	8	18	76	77	0.987	40
16	Worcester City	42	17	6	19	66	71	0.930	40
17	Lovell's Athletic	42	14	11	17	62	60	1.033	39
18	Tonbridge	42	15	9	18	85	91	0.934	39
19	Chelmsford City	42	14	10	18	67	71	0.944	38
20	Exeter City II	42	11	13	18	61	72	0.847	35
21	Cheltenham Town	42	11	12	19	56	83	0.675	34
22	Dartford	42	6	13	23	42	89	0.472	25

Source: rsssf.com
Rules for classification: 1) points; 2) goal ratio.

== Football League elections ==
Four Southern League clubs applied for election to the Football League. However, none were successful as all four League clubs were re-elected.

Club	League	Votes
Chester	Football League	48
Colchester United	Football League	45
Walsall	Football League	32
Halifax Town	Football League	28
Wigan Athletic	Lancashire Combination	19
Peterborough United	Midland League	18
Nelson	Lancashire Combination	3
Worcester City	Southern League	2
Merthyr Tydfil	Southern League	1
Bath City	Southern League	0
North Shields	North Eastern League	0
Yeovil Town	Southern League	0
