= George Prout (footballer) =

English footballer

Personal information
- Full name: George William Prout
- Date of birth: 3 November 1902
- Place of birth: Dalton-in-Furness, England
- Date of death: 1960 (aged 57–58)
- Position: Goalkeeper

Senior career*
Years	Team	Apps	(Gls)
1922–1923	Dalton Casuals		
1923–1926	Preston North End	46	(0)
1926–1927	Grimsby Town	4	(0)
1927–1930	Carlisle United	66	(0)
1930–1931	Bath City		
1931–193?	Cheltenham Town		
- * Club domestic league appearances and goals

George William Prout (3 November 1902 – 1960) was an English professional footballer who played as a goalkeeper.
