= Tony Gough =

English footballer

Personal information
- Full name: Anthony Michael Gough
- Date of birth: 18 March 1940 (age 86)
- Place of birth: Bath, England
- Position: Midfielder

Youth career
- West Twerton Youth Club
- Bath City

Senior career*
Years	Team	Apps	(Gls)
1956–1957	Bath City		
1957–1959	Bristol Rovers	1	(0)
1959–1960	Trowbridge Town		
1960–1961	Frome Town		
1961–1970	Bath City	502	(50)
1970–1971	Swindon Town	25	(2)
1971–1972	Hereford United		
1972–1973	Torquay United	2	(0)
- Bath City
- Welton Rovers
- Cinderford Town
- Melksham Town
Total		28	(2)
- * Club domestic league appearances and goals

Anthony Michael 'Tony' Gough (born 18 March 1940) is an English former professional footballer.

== Career ==
Gough captained Hereford United to a famous 2–1 victory over First Division side Newcastle United. He also played for Bristol Rovers and Swindon Town in the Football League.
