= Gary Smart =

English footballer

Personal information
- Date of birth: 29 April 1964 (age 62)
- Place of birth: Totnes, England
- Position: Defender

Senior career*
Years	Team	Apps	(Gls)
- Wokingham Town
1988–1994	Oxford United	175	(0)
1994	Stevenage Borough		
1994–1995	Chertsey Town		
1995–1996	Chesham United		
1996	Hayes		
1996–1998	Slough Town		
1998–1999	Aldershot Town	23	(0)
1999	Oxford City		
- * Club domestic league appearances and goals

Gary James Smart (born 29 April 1964) is an English former professional footballer who played for Wokingham Town and Oxford United.

Having started out as a PE teacher, he played in the Wokingham team that reached the 1987–88 FA Trophy semi final, before signing for Oxford United in July 1988.

He remained with Oxford United until 1994, making a total of 204 appearances in all competitions, without scoring once. He then dropped down into non-league football. He went to play with Stevenage Borough, Chertsey Town, Chesham United, Hayes, Slough Town, Aldershot Town and Oxford City.

== Personal life ==
Smart currently lives in Devon in the same village as comedian David Earl.
