= Tony Ricketts =

Welsh football manager (born c. 1958)

Tony Ricketts (born c. 1958) is a Welsh former semi-professional footballer.

As a player, at 24 years old, he was offered a two-year contract with Bristol City, which he refused. In 1989, he joined Bath City, where he became first a coach and then manager, spending seven years at the club in all. He played 700 games at conference level in his career.

After leaving Bath, Ricketts worked for the Gloucestershire FA running the county's representative teams, as well as the ladies and under-18s sides. From here he earned a job with the Bristol Rovers women's team, who at the time were in the FA Women's Premier League Southern Division. In his first season at Rovers the team finished runners-up to the league's only professional side, Fulham L.F.C., and in his second year the team cantered to the league title, winning it with a quarter of the season still to spare.

After managing the women's side he went on to manage Bristol Rovers' under-18s' team, and was later appointed manager at Weston-super-Mare.

He was manager of Paulton Rovers for 18 months from October 2015 to April 2017.
