= Jim Rollo =

Scottish footballer

Personal information
- Full name: James Shepherd Rollo
- Date of birth: 16 November 1937
- Place of birth: Helmsdale, Scotland
- Date of death: 13 October 2012 (aged 74)
- Place of death: Perth, Scotland
- Position: Goalkeeper

Youth career
- Jeanfield Swifts

Senior career*
Years	Team	Apps	(Gls)
1955–1957	Hibernian	2	(0)
1957–1960	Poole Town		
1960–1963	Oldham Athletic	59	(0)
1963–1964	Southport	38	(0)
1964–1966	Bradford City	37	(0)
1966–1968	Scarborough		
Total		136	(0)
- * Club domestic league appearances and goals

James Shepherd Rollo (16 November 1937 – 13 October 2012) was a Scottish footballer who played as a goalkeeper in the Scottish Football League and the Football League.

He was born less than 50 miles from John O'Groats, but moved with his family to Perth. Rollo started his senior career with Hibernian as an understudy to Tommy Younger. He made two league appearances for Hibs, but left the club after a contractual dispute. Rollo was a baker and confectioner by trade and wanted to continue that, but Hibs wanted him to become a full-time professional footballer.

Rollo continued his career in England. He signed for Oldham Athletic, but his time at Boundary Park was hampered by the fierce competition with John Hardie and Johnny Bollands. Rollo was a competent goalkeeper, whose strengths were dealing with high shots and crosses. He spent the 1962–63 season mainly in the Oldham reserve team and only made 10 appearances in the promotion winning side. He then moved to Southport, Bradford City and Scarborough.

After retiring as a football player, Rollo moved to Blairgowrie. An accident involving a fork lift truck meant that he had his right leg amputated in 1989. He fully recovered and worked as a scout for Liverpool, mainly covering Highland Football League matches. Rollo died in October 2012, having suffered from cancer for a lengthy period.
