= Kieran Parselle =

English footballer

Personal information
- Full name: Kieran Richard Ferguson Parselle
- Date of birth: 1 December 1996 (age 29)
- Place of birth: Bristol, England
- Position: Defender

Team information
- Current team: Bath City
- Number: 6

Youth career
- 2013–2015: Newport County

Senior career*
Years	Team	Apps	(Gls)
2015–2017	Newport County	7	(0)
2016–2017	→ Salisbury (loan)	23	(1)
2017	Gloucester City	40	(1)
2018–2022	Chippenham Town	126	(9)
2022–	Bath City	180	(8)
- * Club domestic league appearances and goals as of 13:24, 6 September 2026 (UTC)

Kieran Richard Ferguson Parselle (born 1 December 1996) is an English semi professional footballer who plays as a defender for Southern League Premier Division South club Bath City.

== Career ==
Parselle is a product of the Newport County academy and he signed his first professional contract in May 2015.

He made his senior debut for Newport aged 18 in the starting line up for the Football League Cup first round match versus Wolverhampton Wanderers at Molineux on 11 August 2015. Wolves won the game 2–1 but Parselle was named man of the match for an assured display. He made his Football League debut for Newport on 15 August 2015 in a 2–2 draw versus Stevenage.

In September 2015 Parselle was named in the top 11 under 21 footballers to look out for in the FourFourTwo magazine.

In August 2016, Parselle joined Salisbury on loan until 31 January 2017. On 9 May 2017, Parselle was released by Newport at the end of the 2016–17 season.

=== Gloucester City ===
In June 2017 Parselle signed for National League South club Gloucester City.

=== Chippenham Town ===
In June 2018 Parselle signed for National League South club Chippenham Town and in July 2019 Parselle was named club captain. In June 2022 Parselle was named in the Vanarama and Non League paper National League South 2021-22 teams of the season.

=== Bath City ===
On 13 June 2022, Parselle joined Bath City.

== Career statistics ==
As of match played 31 August 2026

Appearances and goals by club, season and competition
Club	Season	League			FA Cup		League Cup		Other		Total	
Club	Season	Division	Apps	Goals	Apps	Goals	Apps	Goals	Apps	Goals	Apps	Goals
Newport County	2015–16	League Two	7	0	0	0	1	0	1 (Note: Appearance in the Football League Trophy)	0	9	0
Salisbury (loan)	2016–17	SFL – Div 1 South & West	23	1	2	0	—		3 (Note: Two appearances in the FA Trophy and one in the Southern League Cup)	0	28	1
Gloucester City	2017–18	National League South	40	1	2	0	—		0	0	42	1
Chippenham Town	2018–19	National League South	41	1	5	0	—		3 (Note: Two appearances in FA Trophy, one appearance in Wiltshire FA Senior Cup)	0	49	1
Chippenham Town	2019–20	National League South	33	3	5	2	—		4 (Note: Two appearances in FA Trophy, two appearances in Wiltshire Premier Shield)	0	42	5
Chippenham Town	2020–21	National League South	14	1	3	0	—		1 (Note: Appearance in FA Trophy)	0	18	1
Chippenham Town	2021–22	National League South	38	4	3	0	—		4 (Note: One appearance in FA Trophy, one appearance in Wiltshire Premier Shield, two appearances in National League South play-offs)	0	45	4
Chippenham Town	Total		126	9	16	2	—		12	0	154	11
Bath City	2022–23	National League South	44	1	3	0	—		6 (Note: Three appearances in FA Trophy, three appearances in Somerset Premier Cup)	0	53	1
Bath City	2023–24	National League South	41	0	3	0	—		6 (Note: Three appearances in FA Trophy, two appearances in Somerset Premier Cup, one appearance in National League South play-offs)	0	50	0
Bath City	2024–25	National League South	44	5	3	0	—		3 (Note: One appearance in FA Trophy, two appearances in Somerset Premier Cup)	0	50	5
Bath City	2025–26	National League South	45	2	1	0	—		6 (Note: Three appearances in FA Trophy, three appearances in Somerset Premier Cup)	0	52	2
Bath City	2026–27	SFL – Prem Div South	6	0	0	0	—		0	0	6	0
Bath City	Total		180	8	10	0	—		21	0	211	8
Career total			376	19	30	2	1	0	37	0	444	21
