= Charlie Brittain =

English footballer

Personal information
- Full name: Richard Charles Brittain
- Date of birth: 7 June 1887
- Place of birth: Isle of Wight, England
- Date of death: 31 July 1949 (aged 62)
- Place of death: Leigh, Kent, England
- Height: 5 ft 11 in (1.80 m)
- Position: Right back

Senior career*
Years	Team	Apps	(Gls)
1904–1906	Portsmouth	?	(?)
1906–1911	Northampton Town	88	(0)
1911–1913	Tottenham Hotspur	40	(0)
1913–1922	Cardiff City	163	(0)
- * Club domestic league appearances and goals

Richard Charles Brittain (7 June 1887 – 31 July 1949) was an English professional footballer who played for Portsmouth, Northampton Town, Tottenham Hotspur and Cardiff City.

== Football career ==
Brittain began his career at Portsmouth before moving to Northampton Town in 1906. He thrived under the management of Herbert Chapman and was chosen to represent a Southern Football League XI on five occasions. In 1911 he signed for Football League side Tottenham Hotspur in an exchange deal involving Walter Tull. Brittain played for 42 matches for the Lilywhites in all competitions between 1911 and 1913 However, he fell behind Fred Webster and Tom Collins and eventually grew frustrated after being overlooked further for Bill Cartwright when a first team place became available through injury and handed in a transfer request in November 1913.

He returned to the Southern League, joining newly promoted First Division side Cardiff City in 1913 for a club record fee of £1,000. His spell with the club was interrupted by the outbreak of World War I but on the return of league football, Brittain was awarded the captaincy of the club and became their first captain in the Football League when they joined in 1920. He also led the club to two Welsh Cup titles in 1920 and 1922 and was selected twice in a Welsh League XI.

== Honours ==
Cardiff City

- Welsh Cup Winner: 1919–20, 1921–22
