= Jackie Boyd =

American soccer player

Personal information
- Full name: John Boyd
- Date of birth: 10 September 1926
- Place of birth: Boston, United States
- Date of death: May 2007 (aged 80)
- Place of death: Horsham, England
- Position: Right winger

Senior career*
Years	Team	Apps	(Gls)
- Gloucester City
1950–1952	Bristol City	31	(6)
- Bath City
- * Club domestic league appearances and goals

John Boyd (10 September 1926 – May 2007) was an American soccer player who played for English clubs Gloucester City, Bristol City and Bath City, as a right winger.
