= Lewis Hogg =

English footballer (born 1982)

Personal information
- Date of birth: 13 September 1982 (age 44)
- Place of birth: Bristol, England
- Position: Midfielder

Team information
- Current team: Mangotsfield United

Youth career
- ?–1999: Bristol Rovers

Senior career*
Years	Team	Apps	(Gls)
1999–2003	Bristol Rovers	74	(3)
2003	Barnet	16	(1)
2003–2006	Weston-super-Mare	?	(?)
2006–2012	Bath City	216 (23)	(37)
2012–2014	Gloucester City	54	(4)
2014–2016	Mangotsfield United		
2016	Yate Town		
2016–	Mangotsfield United		

International career
- England U18

Managerial career
- 2015–2016: Mangotsfield United
- * Club domestic league appearances and goals as of 17:00, 12 June 2012 (UTC)

Lewis Hogg (born 13 September 1982) is an English footballer who plays as a midfielder for Mangotsfield United.

== Career ==
Born in Bristol, Hogg started his career out at Bristol Rovers, rising from the youth team to the first team in 1999. He failed to record an appearance in his first year, but by his second year he was a stalwart in the midfield and was named team captain by manager Garry Thompson. However soon after Thompson left the club, Hogg saw his time dwindle until he was eventually released by the club in the summer of 2003. In total, Hogg appeared in 74 league games, scoring 3 times for the Pirates. He also made 17 additional cup appearances, scoring an additional 3 goals, including a memorable equaliser at Goodison Park against Premier League side Everton in the League Cup.

After leaving Bristol Rovers, Hogg found his way to Barnet where he appeared 16 times in half a season, scoring for them once against Leigh Genesis F.C. While with Barnet, Hogg represented England at the non-league level.

Hogg was quickly on the move again, joining Conference South side Weston-super-Mare in December 2003. He quickly found himself as a midfield force for The Seagulls and spent two and a half years at Woodspring Stadium.

It came with much surprise that Hogg wanted to move to Bath City in the summer of 2006, dropping down a league in the process. After the clubs were unable to agree on a fee, an independent tribunal decided on a £4000 fee to be paid to Weston-super-Mare for Hogg's signature.

Once at Bath City, Hogg was a hit. Despite having a less than stellar disciplinary record, Hogg has proven to be quite a pickup for the Twerton Park side. In his first season with Bath City, he saw the team promoted to the Conference South. His former club Weston-super-Mare took notice of "the one that got away" as well, putting in a £2,000 bid on New Year's Eve 2008 for the midfielder, which Bath manager Adie Britton rejected.

He departed Bath following the club's relegation to the Conference South after signing for Gloucester City of the Conference North in June 2012.

After leaving Gloucester joined Mangotsfield United in 2014, briefly serving as caretaker manager in 2015. He left to join Yate in 2016, before returning to Mangotsfield.

== Honours ==
Bath City

- Conference South play-offs: 2009–10
