= Guildford City F.C. =

English football club

Guildford City
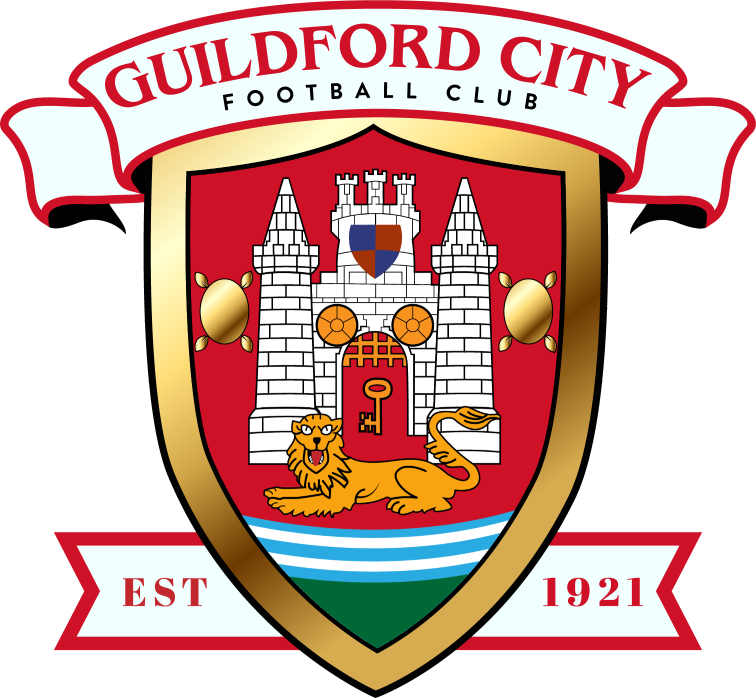
- Full name: Guildford City Football Club
- Nicknames: The Sweeney, The City
- Founded: in 1921 (as Guildford United); re-formed in 1996 (as A.F.C. Guildford)
- Ground: Spectrum Football Ground, Guildford
- Capacity: 1,320 (255 seated)
- Chairman: George M Haddad
- Manager: Luke Simmonds
- League: Southern Combination Division One
- 2025–26: Combined Counties League Premier Division South, 20th of 20 (relegated)
Home colours	Away colours

Guildford City Football Club (formerly Guildford United and AFC Guildford) is a football club based in Guildford, Surrey, England. The club was established in 1921, folded in 1974 and was reformed in 1996. Guildford City play in the Southern Combination Division One.

== History ==
=== 1921 – Second World War ===
The first club in the town was amateur side Guildford, formed in 1877 and known as the "Pinks". They played home matches at the Woodbridge Road Sports Ground. A successful start led to a number of people mooting a new professional club and by the end of 1920 Guildford United was formed. In May 1921 they were accepted into the Southern League. At the same time land had been purchased in Joseph's Road and "United" were able to kick off the 1921–22 season with a home match against Reading F.C. Reserves. Playing in green and white the hosts won 2–0 with a crowd of over 5,000 fans or tourists spectators.

In 1927 Guildford became a diocese and the Guildford Cathedral was built. It was believed that Guildford would become a city so the club changed its name and the "City" was born. At this time they also changed the colours to red and white stripes.

Although they had little early success in the League, the FA Cup bought a taste of glory in 1928–29 when, having battled through the qualifying rounds, they beat Queens Park Rangers 4–2 in the First Round Proper and in front of a crowd of nearly 8,000.

Despite excellent gates the club was facing a financial crisis at the end of the season – this was to be a recurrent theme throughout the club's history. At the start of the 1936–37 season the club made the massive decision to turn full-time professional, appointing Haydn Green as manager. That season they finished 4th but next season things got even better.

In 1937–38 City beat Reading in the FA Cup but in the league they won 22 of their 34 games to finish as Champions for the first time. That feat was nearly repeated the following year, with City finishing runners-up to Colchester United by one point, scoring 126 goals in the process. In the league game at home to Colchester on Easter Monday City won 3–1 in front of the largest crowd ever for a league game at Joseph's Road 9,443. Earlier that season City had attracted an even bigger crowd to Joseph's Road for an FA Cup 1st Round Replay against local rivals Aldershot. 9,932 people saw City lose a nail-biting game 4–3.

This successful period was brought to a premature conclusion by the outbreak of the Second World War.

=== Second World War – 1974 ===
The ground had been used by the Army during the War. In 1946–47 City re-entered the Southern League – this time as a part-time club. In 1950–51 the team reached the final of the Southern League Cup for the first time, losing to Merthyr Tydfil despite winning the first leg.

In the 1951–52 season the City undertook their longest trip when they travelled to Gateshead in the 2nd Round of the FA Cup. An estimated 5,000 supporters made the overnight trip to the North East of England in December. A 15,000 crowd saw City dominate the game but lose 2–0. In debt again, City sold Jimmy Langley to Leeds for £2,000. He eventually joined Fulham and earned three England international caps.

Archie Macaulay was brought in as player-manager in 1953 and he started building a side that would win the title in 1955–56. However, he left before the end of the season leaving Bill Thompson to take over and lead the side to the championship. In 1958–59 the League expanded and was regionalised. City were in the South Eastern zone and could only finish 15th out of 17.

For 1959 the league was revised again, this time to a Premier and First Division. City's miserable time the year before meant they started in the lower division. Albert Tennant, who had been a coach at Chelsea, took charge and he led City to promotion. In the 1962–63 season they lifted the Southern League Cup for the first time, beating Nuneaton Borough 2–1 on aggregate over two legs.

Despite this success by the summer of 1965 it seemed that finance was again a major problem at the club. A strict budget left the club short of players, resulting in a disappointing 16th-place finish, although they did manage to reach the final of the Southern League Cup again. They went on better the next year, winning the Southern League Cup with a 2–1 aggregate success over Barnet.

In 1967–68 City had a notable FA Cup run. Drawn away to Brentford the city were leading 2–1 when the match was abandoned during the second half because of snow. A second trip to Griffin Park ended with a 2–2 draw and meant a replay at Joseph's Road in front of 7,500 fans who roared City to a famous 2–1 victory. Goalkeeper Peter Vasper was sold to Norwich City for £5000 and it was thought that this might ease the club's financial problems but they were worse than many had realised. The following season brought the end of Albert Tennant's nine-year reign and the club was relegated.

In 1969–70 Joseph's Road was sold to signal the beginning of the end for the club. The following year they reached the second round of the FA Cup but the inevitable was only being delayed and although in 1972–73 the club again reached the first round of the FA Cup (a visit to Watford ended with a 4–2 defeat), they could only finish 18th in the League. Crowds of 4,000 were needed to break even but barely a quarter of that was achieved at most games.

In 1973–74 a new board of directors took over with Bill Bellerby elected President (recently elected as Patron of the new club) and club stalwart Darby Watts as player manager. Despite the best efforts of Mr Bellerby and the long-standing chairman of the Supporters' Club John Daborn, it was soon announced that the club was to merge with Dorking and play at Meadowbank. The final game at Joseph's Road was played on 12 February 1974 when the City beat Folkestone 2–0 in front of 625 fans. After 53 years senior football at Joseph's Road had come to an end.

=== Rebirth in 1996 ===
In 1996 Bill Bellerby, then-Mayor of Guildford, enquired as to whether Burpham FC would be prepared to move to the Spectrum Leisure Centre and represent Guildford. Spectrum provided a venue which had the potential for development into senior football and already had floodlighting.

AFC Guildford played in the Surrey Premier League, which eventually became Division One of the Combined Counties League. In 2003–04 AFC Guildford were crowned champions of Division One and gained their first-ever major honour. Promotion was obtained into the Combined Counties Premier Division, ground-sharing with Cranleigh FC while Spectrum was upgraded to meet the league's standards. In early November 2004, AFC Guildford returned to their home ground near to the town centre.

In 2005 the club changed its name to Guildford United, but quickly acquired the name of Guildford City. The club finished second bottom in 2006–07 but the following season secured a runner-up finish in the Combined Counties Premier League under Scott Steele and Lloyd Wye. Kevin Rayner, and his assistant Roly Martin, took charge in 2009. After escaping relegation and undergoing a season of improvement, in 2011-12 the club had its furthest progress in the FA Vase to date, but better was to come when the side clinched the Combined Counties Premier Division trophy. The club was denied promotion due to Spectrum failing a ground grading inspection. They retained their league title the following season and this time took their place in the Southern League Division One Central. However, in May 2013, having guided City to a ninth-place finish in the new club's inaugural Southern League season, Kevin Rayner left the club to manage Chipstead.

Guildford City were switched to the Southern League Division One South & West for the 2013–14 season, with former Sandhurst Town and Cove manager Dean Thomas taking the helm. Thomas resigned in November 2013 following a run of 10 consecutive defeats. Kevin Rayner immediately returned to the club following his sacking by Chipstead earlier that month but was unable to prevent City from finishing bottom of the league and being relegated back to the Combined Counties League.

== Stadia ==
Since 1996, Guildford City have played their home games at Guildford Spectrum. The ground began as an extremely basic one but following City's promotion to the CCL Premier League in 2003/04 it was upgraded to meet the requirements of the division – a covered stand with 135 seats, a new officials changing room and toilets for public use being built. City used Cranleigh's ground while these changes were being made.

Further improvements were made in 2011 and 2013 to meet requirements for Step 4 football, including extra seating, a covered terrace and hard standing around two further sides of the pitch. The record attendance is 545 when a strong Woking side visited for the Surrey Senior Cup Semi Final on 15 March 2017. The record FA Cup attendance was set on 8 September 2012 when the visit of Kingstonian in the FA Cup First Qualifying Round drew a crowd of 295 spectators. The club is keen to relocate from the ground however, and has pursued various options including groundsharing with Woking and joining community regeneration projects – none of which has yet come to fruition.

The question of where Guildford United would play their home games figured largely when discussions began about setting up a professional football club in Guildford in 1920. Guildford FC, 'The Pinks', played their matches at the Woodbridge Road Sports Ground and some suggested a groundshare agreement could be negotiated. Most, however, agreed the club should have a ground of its own.

Eventually an approach was made to Mr W. Triggs Turner who owned land in Guildford, and he made a very generous offer. Not only was he prepared to support the project, but he interested himself personally in the formation of the new club, and granted a loan to acquire the Joseph's Road ground. Mr Triggs Turner later set the seal on his generosity by wiping off the mortgage, and when the club came into being he was elected the first chairman of the directors.

The original Guildford City spent their entire existence at Joseph's Road, before it was sold for development in 1974. The ground had a capacity of around 10,000, the record attendance being 9,932 for an FA Cup replay against Aldershot in the 1938–39 season.

== Honours ==
- Southern League Premier Division
  - Champions: 1937–38, 1955–56
- Southern League Division One
  - Champions: 1970–71
- Combined Counties League Premier Division
  - Champions: 2010–11, 2011–12

== Records ==
- Best FA Cup performance: Second Round proper 1928–29, 1937–38, 1951–52, 1965–66, 1967–68, 1971–72
- Best FA Trophy performance: Second Round proper 1973–74
- Best FA Vase performance: Fourth Round proper, 2010–11
- Record Attendance (FA Cup) 9,932 vs Aldershot on 3 December 1938; 295 vs Kingstonian on 8 September 2012. (League) 9,443 vs Colchester United on 12 April 1939. (Current Record) - 341 vs Redhill on 19 April 2025. (Previous Record) - 272 vs Farnham Town on 30 December 2023, (Previous Record) - 239 vs Godalming Town on 1 April 2013. Record Attendance at the Spectrum Ground - (Surrey Senior Cup) - 545 vs Woking FC on 15th Match 2017.
- Most Appearances: 632 (Darby Watts – 1961–74)
- Most goals in a season: 72 (Jock Thom)
- Most goals in a match: 7 (Jim Brown versus Exeter Reserves on 14 December 1938)

== Partner clubs ==
The club has strong connections to German football club Freiburger FC, with Freiburg im Breisgau being a sister city of Guildford, and publishes news and results of the later club on its website, just as Freiburg does for City. The club is also linked to Havnar Bóltfelag from the Faroe Islands.
