= Frankie Artus =

English footballer

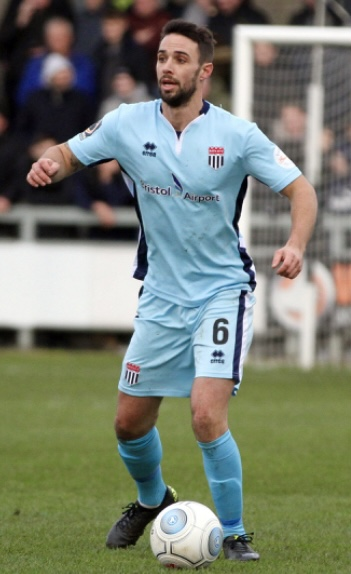
- Artus playing for Bath City in 2019.

Personal information
- Date of birth: 27 September 1988 (age 38)
- Place of birth: Bristol, England
- Position: Midfielder

Youth career
- 1995–2006: Bristol City

Senior career*
| Years | Team | Apps | (Gls) |
| 2006–2010 | Bristol City | 0 | (0) |
| 2007–2008 | → Exeter City (loan) | 10 | (0) |
| 2008 | → Brentford (loan) | 1 | (0) |
| 2009 | → Kettering Town (loan) | 5 | (0) |
| 2009 | → Cheltenham Town (loan) | 9 | (3) |
| 2009 | → Cheltenham Town (loan) | 7 | (0) |
| 2010 | → Chesterfield (loan) | 3 | (0) |
| 2010–2011 | Cheltenham Town | 29 | (3) |
| 2011–2013 | Grimsby Town | 51 | (3) |
| 2013–2014 | Hereford United | 34 | (1) |
| 2014–2021 | Bath City | 189 | (11) |
| 2021–2022 | Swindon Supermarine | 7 | (0) |
| 2022–2023 | Bristol Manor Farm | 14 | (0) |
| Total | | 359 | (21) |
- * Club domestic league appearances and goals

Frankie Artus (born 27 September 1988) is an English former professional footballer who played as a midfielder.

He has previously played professionally for Bristol City, Exeter City, Brentford, Chesterfield, Cheltenham Town and Grimsby Town as well as at non-league level for Kettering Town, Hereford United, Bath City, Swindon Supermarine and Bristol Manor Farm.

== Playing career ==
=== Bristol City ===
Artus began his career as a schoolboy with the Bristol City academy from the age of seven. He was contracted to Bristol City from 2006 having agreed a professional contract, but did not play a first team game in the four years he was there. He was included amongst the five replacements to face Premier League side Middlesbrough in the FA Cup and then again in the replay between the two sides. On 3 August 2007, it was announced that Artus would spend a month on loan at Conference National side Exeter City. The following season, he joined Brentford on loan for an initial one-month period and made his Football League debut coming on as a substitute against Dagenham & Redbridge.

In January 2009 he was loaned out to Kettering Town until early March and upon his return he was then loaned out again this time to Cheltenham Town. Artus scored on his Cheltenham debut on 24 March 2009 in a 1–1 draw with Oldham Athletic.

He re-joined Cheltenham on a month loan in August 2009. After making four appearances he returned to Bristol City due to injury. On 16 October 2009 he re-joined for a third time again for a month. He returned to Bristol in late December 2009 and was included in the squad for the 2–2 home draw to Watford on 28 December.

In January 2010 he joined Chesterfield on a one-month loan deal.

=== Cheltenham Town ===
He subsequently signed a one-year contract with League Two club Cheltenham Town in July 2010.

On 9 May 2011, Artus was released from Cheltenham after his contract expired.

=== Grimsby Town ===
On 5 July 2011, Artus signed for Grimsby Town. Artus scored the 2nd goal of the game against Telford United on 28 January 2012, Andi Thanoj cut inside the box and found Artus who slotted the ball into the bottom right corner to secure a 2–0 win for Grimsby.

He signed a 1-year contract extension with the club just after the 2011–2012 season had finished. Artus scored his first goal of the season for Grimsby on 27 August 2012 against Mansfield Town, scoring the opening goal of the game on 35 minutes, a good passing move from Andy Cook to release Joe Colbeck down the wing passing to Derek Niven in turn with a one touch pass to Artus who unleashed an unstoppable curling effort from 20 yards which found the top left corner, the game finishing 4–1 to the Mariners. Artus was released on 2 May 2013.

=== Non-league ===
In July 2013 Artus joined Hereford United on trial. He agreed a one-year contract with Hereford United on 31 July 2013.

In June 2014 Artus signed for Bath City. After seven seasons with the club, Artus departed in June 2021.

On 25 June 2021, Artus signed for Swindon Supermarine.

On 17 November 2022, Artus signed for Bristol Manor Farm as a free agent.

== Personal life ==
Artus has been a supporter of Bristol City football club since he was a child, having watched games since the age of six, through his youth academy years.

== Style of play ==
A statement Artus made previously back in 2006 before signing professional terms at Bristol City said "I can play as an attacking midfielder or a defensive one. I still want to add more goals to my game, even though I netted a few earlier this season."

== Career statistics ==
As of match played 2 December 2017

Appearances and goals by club, season and competition
| Club | Season | League | | | National Cup | | League Cup | | Other | | Total | |
| Club | Season | Division | Apps | Goals | Apps | Goals | Apps | Goals | Apps | Goals | Apps | Goals |
|---|---|---|---|---|---|---|---|---|---|---|---|---|
| Exeter City (loan) | 2007–08 | Conference Premier | 10 | 0 | 0 | 0 | — | | 0 | 0 | 10 | 0 |
| Brentford (loan) | 2008–09 | League Two | 1 | 0 | 0 | 0 | 0 | 0 | 1 (Note: Appearances in the Football League Trophy) | 0 | 2 | 0 |
| Kettering Town (loan) | 2008–09 | Conference Premier | 5 | 0 | 0 | 0 | — | | 1 (Note: Appearances in the FA Trophy) | 0 | 6 | 0 |
| Cheltenham Town (loan) | 2008–09 | League One | 9 | 3 | 0 | 0 | 0 | 0 | 0 | 0 | 9 | 3 |
| Cheltenham Town (loan) | 2009–10 | League Two | 7 | 0 | 0 | 0 | 0 | 0 | 1 | 0 | 8 | 0 |
| Chesterfield (loan) | 2009–10 | League Two | 3 | 0 | 0 | 0 | 0 | 0 | 0 | 0 | 3 | 0 |
| Cheltenham Town | 2010–11 | League Two | 29 | 3 | 0 | 0 | 1 | 0 | 0 | 0 | 30 | 3 |
| Grimsby Town | 2011–12 | Conference Premier | 29 | 1 | 2 | 0 | — | | 3 | 0 | 34 | 1 |
| Grimsby Town | 2012–13 | Conference Premier | 22 | 2 | 1 | 0 | — | | 1 | 0 | 24 | 2 |
| Grimsby Town | Grimsby total | | 51 | 3 | 3 | 0 | 0 | 0 | 4 | 0 | 58 | 3 |
| Hereford United | 2013–14 | Conference Premier | 34 | 1 | 2 | 0 | — | | 1 | 0 | 37 | 1 |
| Bath City | 2014–15 | Conference South | 29 | 2 | 1 | 0 | — | | 9 (Note: Eight appearances and two goals in the FA Trophy; one appearance in the Somerset Premier Cup) | 2 | 39 | 4 |
| Bath City | 2015–16 | National League South | 34 | 4 | 3 | 2 | — | | 1 (Note: Appearance in the Somerset Premier Cup) | 1 | 38 | 7 |
| Bath City | 2016–17 | National League South | 32 | 1 | 4 | 1 | — | | 3 (Note: Two appearances in the FA Trophy and one in the Somerset Premier Cup) | 0 | 39 | 2 |
| Bath City | 2017–18 | National League South | 18 | 0 | 2 | 0 | — | | 0 | 0 | 20 | 0 |
| Bath City | Bath City total | | 113 | 7 | 10 | 3 | 0 | 0 | 13 | 3 | 136 | 13 |
| Career total | | | 167 | 17 | 15 | 3 | 1 | 0 | 21 | 3 | 299 | 23 |
