= Graham Withey =

English footballer

Personal information
- Full name: Graham Alfred Withey
- Date of birth: 11 June 1960 (age 66)
- Place of birth: Bristol, England
- Height: 6 ft 3 in (1.91 m)
- Position: Forward

Senior career*
| Years | Team | Apps | (Gls) |
| 1979–1980 | Welton Rovers | | |
| 1980–1982 | Bath City | 67 | (32) |
| 1982–1983 | Bristol Rovers | 22 | (10) |
| 1983–1984 | Coventry City | 22 | (4) |
| 1984 | Seiko SA | 5 | (5) |
| 1984–1986 | Cardiff City | 27 | (7) |
| 1986 | Bath City | 14 | (7) |
| 1986–1987 | Bristol City | 2 | (0) |
| 1987–1988 | Bath City | 9 | (3) |
| 1988 | Cheltenham Town | 10 | (5) |
| 1988–1989 | Exeter City | 7 | (2) |
| 1989 | Brisbane City | | |
| 1989 | Weymouth | | (2) |
| 1989–1991 | Gloucester City | 40 | (18) |
| 1991–1993 | Bath City | 81 | (15) |
| 1993–1994 | Yate Town | | |
| 1993–1994 | Weston-super-Mare | | |
| 1995–1996 | Bath City | 35 | (12) |
| 1996–1997 | Trowbridge Town | | |
- * Club domestic league appearances and goals

Graham Alfred Withey (born 11 June 1960) is an English former professional footballer who played in the Football League as a forward.

He was sent on a 3-month loan to Seiko FC of Hong Kong in 1984.
