= Gethin Jones (footballer, born 1981) =

Welsh footballer

Personal information
- Date of birth: 8 August 1981 (age 45)
- Place of birth: Carmarthen, Wales
- Position: Defender

Team information
- Current team: Cirencester Town (on loan from Merthyr Town)

Senior career*
Years	Team	Apps	(Gls)
1998–2000	Carmarthen Town	18	(2)
2000–2003	Cardiff City	3	(0)
2003–2005	Merthyr Tydfil	39	(0)
2005–2013	Bath City	210	(5)
2013–2014	Port Talbot Town	24	(2)
2014–2016	Cirencester Town		
2016–	Merthyr Town		
2017–	→ Cirencester Town (loan)		
- * Club domestic league appearances and goals as of 16:39, 14 August 2010 (UTC)

Gethin Jones (born 8 August 1981) is a Welsh footballer who plays for Cirencester Town on loan from Merthyr Town as a defender.

== Football career ==
=== Cardiff City (2001–2003) ===
Born in Carmarthen, He played for Carmarthen Town FC. Cardiff City bought him for a fee around £50,000. Jones began his professional footballing career at Cardiff City. He made three appearances in The Football League for Cardiff. Jones made his debut in the Football League Trophy Southern Section First Round in the 7–1 home win over Rushden & Diamonds on 15 October 2001, replacing Andy Thompson as a substitute in the 84th minute. He broke his leg during a game and ended his Cardiff City career.

=== Merthyr Tydfil (2003–2005) ===
Jones made his first appearance for Merthyr Tydfil, in the Southern Football League Premier Division in August 2003 against Chesham United. He played for two years at Merthyr Tydfil.

=== Bath City (2005–2013) ===
Jones joined Bath City in the summer of 2005. He played over two hundred times for the club.
