= Paul Adcock =

English footballer

Personal information
- Full name: Paul Malcolm Adcock
- Date of birth: 2 May 1972 (age 54)
- Place of birth: Ilminster, England
- Height: 5 ft 8 in (1.73 m)
- Position: Striker

Senior career*
| Years | Team | Apps | (Gls) |
| 1990–1993 | Plymouth Argyle | 48 | (2) |
| 1993–1996 | Bath City | | (45) |
| 1996 | Torquay United | | (0) |
| 1996 | Bath City | 5 | (1) |
| 1996–1998 | Weymouth | 76 | (15) |
| 1998–2000 | Gloucester City | | |
| 2000–2002 | Saltash United | | |
| 2002–20?? | Tavistock | | |
- * Club domestic league appearances and goals

Paul Malcolm Adcock (born 2 May 1972) is an English former professional footballer who played as a forward.

== Career ==
Adcock was born in Ilminster, Somerset. He began as an apprentice with Plymouth Argyle, turning professional on 7 August 1990. He made his league debut for the Pilgrims on 18 September 1990 in a 2–2 draw with Oxford United at Home Park. Paul was selected for England un19s for the world youth championships during this time.

He had a severe back problem while establishing himself in the Plymouth side, making 21 league appearances and 48 in total in the following three years until his release by manager Peter Shilton in the 1993 close season when he joined Bath City. On his debut for Bath in August 1993, he scored three goals, with his form in the conference (averaging a goal every other game) leading to a second chance at league football when Torquay United signed him on 16 August 1996.

However, hampered by a foot injury and 38-year-old Gary Nelson player-coach picking himself every week, Paul only played only once, as a second-half substitute for Rodney Jack in the 3–3 League Cup draw at home to Bristol City on 28 August, before being released and returning to non-league football. He initially returned to Bath City before joining Gloucester City, managed by Leroy Rosenior, in November 1996. Gloucester underwent many changes during the short period of time Adcock was at the club, mainly due to the serious financial difficulties the club was facing. Adcock subsequently joined Weymouth, originally on loan on 31 March 1998, and a Bosman free transfer in the 1998 close-season.

He stayed with the Terras until the summer of 2000. When his contract ran out. He had spent much of the previous season out with a hernia groin injury and was unhappy about being released without the chance to prove his fitness. He subsequently joined Saltash United, playing alongside another former Torquay player, Michael Preston. Likewise, he later played for Devon non-league side Tavistock while working and owning a scaffolding business, receiving the chairman's player of the year award for the 2003–2004 season, and was still with the club in the 2005–06 season, scoring three league goals.
