= Dave Gilroy =

English footballer (born 1982)

Personal information
- Full name: David Gilroy
- Date of birth: 23 December 1982 (age 43)
- Place of birth: Yeovil, England
- Height: 5 ft 11 in (1.80 m)
- Position: Forward

Team information
- Current team: Cribbs

Youth career
- Bristol Rovers

Senior career*
Years	Team	Apps	(Gls)
2001–2004	Bristol Rovers	18	(0)
2002	→ Bath City (loan)	4	(2)
2003	→ Forest Green Rovers (loan)	5	(0)
2003	→ Clevedon Town (loan)	1	(0)
2003–2005	Weston-super-Mare	36	(10)
2005–2007	Chippenham Town	108	(55)
2007–2009	Bath City	71	(41)
2009–2010	Newport County	10	(2)
2009	→ Weston-super-Mare (loan)	6	(7)
2010	→ Bath City (loan)	7	(2)
2010–2011	Woking	21	(7)
2011–2012	Chippenham Town	43	(9)
2012–2013	Frome Town	31	(8)
2013–2016	Cribbs	76	(50)
- * Club domestic league appearances and goals as of 1 May 2016

David Gilroy (born 23 December 1982) is an English retired former professional footballer who played in the forward position.

== Career ==
Gilroy began his career as a trainee with Bristol Rovers, turning professional in August 2001. He made his debut on 25 August 2001, as a late substitute for Martin Cameron in Rovers' 3–2 win at home to Luton Town. He joined Bath City on loan in March 2002. He scored twice in five games before returning to Rovers, playing once more before the end of the season.

He joined Forest Green Rovers on a month's loan in August 2003 and joined Clevedon Town on loan the following month. Gilroy spent three months on loan to Chippenham Town before a £1,000 fee was agreed to make the move permanent in February 2005. He finished the 2005–06 season as joint Southern League top scorer, scoring 30 times in total. He scored a further 22 times the following season, attracting the interest of Conference National side Exeter City. However, he returned to Bath City in May 2007, and was their leading scorer in the following season with 26 goals.

Gilroy signed for Newport County of the Conference South on 29 April 2009. In October 2009 he was loaned to Weston-super-mare and scored a hat-trick in his first match. He returned to Newport 15 November on completion of his loan spell having scored 7 goals in 6 matches for Weston but was injured shortly afterwards. In February 2010 he rejoined Bath City on loan. The loan arrangement completed in March 2010. Gilroy completed the 2009–10 season at Newport who were crowned Conference South champions with a record 103 points, 28 points ahead of second placed Dover Athletic. He totalled 14 Conference South goals for the season.

Gilroy became Woking manager Graham Baker's fifth new signing in the 2010 off-season, agreeing a deal with the Surrey club on the first day of June that will last until the end of the 2010–11 season.

In May 2011, Gilroy was released by Woking FC. On 1 July 2011 it was announced that he had rejoined Chippenham Town FC. However it was a stay that would last little over a year as in September 2012 it was announced that he had joined Southern Premier League rivals Frome Town.

In September 2013, Gilroy signed for Western League Premier Division side Cribbs.
