= Martin Paul (footballer) =

English footballer (born 1975)

Personal information
- Date of birth: 2 February 1975 (age 51)
- Place of birth: Whalley, Lancashire, England
- Position: Forward

Youth career
- Bristol Rovers

Senior career*
Years	Team	Apps	(Gls)
1993–1996	Bristol Rovers	22	(1)
1996	Doncaster Rovers	0	(0)
1996–2001	Bath City	164	(84)
2001–2002	Newport County		
2002–2005	Chippenham Town		
2005	Bath City	27	(4)
2005–2006	Mangotsfield United		
2006	Chippenham Town		
2007–2008	Bath City	13	(4)
2008–	Chippenham Town		
- * Club domestic league appearances and goals

Martin Paul (born 2 February 1975) is an English former professional footballer.

== Playing career ==
Paul began his career as a trainee with Bristol Rovers. He played 29 first-team games before being released in 1996. He joined Doncaster Rovers, but in November 1996 joined Bath City. After initially struggling to establish himself, Paul became a regular goalscorer for Bath, including scoring 30 goals in the 1998–99 season to be the top scorer in the Southern League.

He was sold to Newport County in May 2001 for £3,000, from where he moved to Chippenham Town, again for a four-figure fee, in July 2002. He returned to Bath City in February 2005. However, his second spell with Bath was not as successful as his first and he left to join Mangotsfield United in December 2005.

He was linked with a move to Paulton Rovers in September 2006, and later played for Chippenham before retiring during the 2006–07 season. He did however come out of retirement to play for Bath City in their Errea cup tie against Tiverton Town in January 2007, and began playing in their league side again while on non-contract terms.

In February 2008 he signed again for Chippenham Town.

== Coaching career ==
Paul is currently the head coach of the Tyrone Mings Academy, providing football coaching opportunities for children in the South-West and the Midlands.
