= Cody Cooke =

English footballer

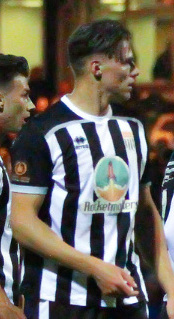
- Cooke in 2022

Personal information
- Date of birth: 2 March 1993 (age 33)
- Place of birth: Truro, England
- Height: 1.80 m (5 ft 11 in)
- Position: Striker

Team information
- Current team: Torquay United
- Number: 9

Senior career*
| Years | Team | Apps | (Gls) |
- Penryn Athletic
| 2011–2018 | Truro City | 236 | (47) |
| 2018–2020 | St Mirren | 17 | (3) |
| 2020–2021 | Weymouth | 17 | (2) |
| 2021–2024 | Bath City | 108 | (44) |
| 2024– | Torquay United | 60 | (23) |
- * Club domestic league appearances and goals as of 19:31, 1 February 2026 (UTC)

Cody Cooke (born 2 March 1993) is an English professional footballer who plays as a striker for Torquay United.

== Early and personal life ==
Born in Truro, Cooke attended Penryn College.

== Career ==
Cooke began his career in English non-league football with Penryn Athletic, before playing for Truro City between 2011 and 2018, while studying for a PGCE in Sport Development at Plymouth Marjon University.

After spending time with the V9 Academy, Cooke turned professional in June 2018, after signing for Scottish club St Mirren alongside Josh Heaton. He made his debut for St Mirren on 13 July 2018 in the Scottish League Cup. He scored a hat-trick in the final game of the 2018–19 season. He described his first season as a professional as a "rollercoaster".

On 1 August 2019, the club confirmed that Cooke would be out of action for between six and nine months after rupturing knee ligaments during a match. He returned to action in December 2019.

On 2 June 2020 it was announced that he would remain with the club under the coronavirus furlough scheme before leaving the club. In June 2020, Cooke left Saints when his contract expired. Cooke said he wanted to move nearer to his home in Cornwall, and would consider returning to part-time football in order to do so.

On 28 August 2020, Cooke signed for newly-promoted National League side Weymouth.

Cooke was released from Weymouth at the end of the 2020–21 season, and on 11 June 2021 joined National League South side Bath City.

On 23 July 2024, Cooke signed for fellow National League side Torquay United.

== Career statistics ==
As of 31 January 2026

Appearances and goals by club, season and competition
| Club | Season | League | | | National Cup (Note: Includes FA Cup and Scottish Cup) | | League Cup (Note: Includes Scottish League Cup) | | Other | | Total | |
| Club | Season | Division | Apps | Goals | Apps | Goals | Apps | Goals | Apps | Goals | Apps | Goals |
|---|---|---|---|---|---|---|---|---|---|---|---|---|
| Truro City | 2011–12 | National League South | 18 | 2 | 0 | 0 | — | | 1 (Note: Appearance(s) in the FA Trophy.) | 0 | 19 | 2 |
| Truro City | 2012–13 | National League South | 41 | 1 | 0 | 0 | — | | 0 | 0 | 41 | 1 |
| Truro City | 2013–14 | Southern Football League | 43 | 9 | 4 | 1 | — | | 0 | 0 | 47 | 10 |
| Truro City | 2014–15 | Southern Football League | 35 | 14 | 7 | 0 | — | | 0 | 0 | 42 | 14 |
| Truro City | 2015–16 | National League South | 41 | 4 | 0 | 0 | — | | 3 | 0 | 44 | 4 |
| Truro City | 2016–17 | National League South | 21 | 4 | 0 | 0 | — | | 0 | 0 | 21 | 4 |
| Truro City | 2017–18 | National League South | 37 | 13 | 2 | 0 | — | | 1 | 0 | 40 | 13 |
| Truro City | Total | | 236 | 47 | 13 | 1 | 0 | 0 | 5 | 0 | 254 | 48 |
| St Mirren | 2018–19 | Scottish Premiership | 11 | 3 | 1 | 1 | 3 | 0 | 2 (Note: Appearance(s) in the play-offs.) | 0 | 17 | 4 |
| St Mirren | 2019–20 | Scottish Premiership | 6 | 0 | 0 | 0 | 4 | 0 | 0 | 0 | 10 | 0 |
| St Mirren | Total | | 17 | 3 | 1 | 1 | 7 | 0 | 2 | 0 | 27 | 4 |
| Weymouth | 2020–21 | National League | 17 | 2 | 1 | 0 | — | | 2 | 1 | 20 | 3 |
| Bath City | 2021–22 | National League South | 39 | 14 | 3 | 2 | — | | 6 (Note: One appearance in FA Trophy, five appearances and four goals in Somerset Premier Cup) | 4 | 48 | 20 |
| Bath City | 2022–23 | National League South | 27 | 13 | 3 | 1 | — | | 2 (Note: One appearance in FA Trophy, one appearance and one goal in Somerset Premier Cup) | 1 | 32 | 15 |
| Bath City | 2023–24 | National League South | 42 | 17 | 2 | 2 | — | | 6 (Note: Three appearances in FA Trophy, two appearances and one goal in Somerset Premier Cup, one appearance in National League South play-offs) | 1 | 50 | 20 |
| Bath City | Total | | 108 | 44 | 8 | 5 | 0 | 0 | 14 | 6 | 130 | 55 |
| Torquay United | 2024–25 | National League South | 43 | 20 | 0 | 0 | — | | 2 | 0 | 45 | 20 |
| Torquay United | 2025–26 | National League South | 17 | 3 | 1 | 0 | — | | 0 | 0 | 18 | 3 |
| Torquay United | Total | | 60 | 23 | 1 | 0 | 0 | 0 | 2 | 0 | 63 | 23 |
| Career total | | | 438 | 119 | 24 | 7 | 7 | 0 | 25 | 7 | 494 | 133 |
