= Jimmy Rollo =

English footballer

Jim Rollo
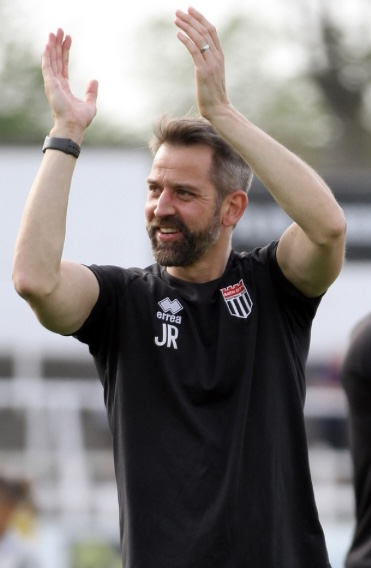
- Rollo in 2019

Personal information
- Full name: James Stuart Rollo
- Date of birth: 22 May 1976 (age 50)
- Place of birth: Wisbech, England
- Position: Defender

Team information
- Current team: Bath City (assistant manager)

Senior career*
| Years | Team | Apps | (Gls) |
| 1995–1996 | Walsall | 2 | (0) |
| 1996–1998 | Cardiff City | 37 | (1) |
| 1997 | → Bath City (loan) | 4 | (0) |
| 1998 | → Ebbw Vale (loan) | 8 | (0) |
| 1998–1999 | Forest Green Rovers | 32 | (0) |
| 1999 | → Bath City (loan) | 4 | (0) |
| 1999–2001 | Clevedon Town | 98 | (10) |
| 2001–2002 | Merthyr Tydfil | 48 | (1) |
| 2002–2012 | Bath City | 481 | (9) |
| 2012–2013 | Chippenham Town | 9 | (0) |
| 2013–2016 | Bath City | 2 | (0) |
| Total | | 876 | (21) |
- * Club domestic league appearances and goals

James Stuart Rollo (born 22 May 1976) is an English former footballer who was the assistant manager of Bath City until 2021.

== Career ==
Born in Wisbech, Rollo began his career at Walsall as a trainee but made just one first-team appearance for the side in the Football League Trophy as a substitute before being released. He instead joined Cardiff City on non-contract terms, making his debut on 31 January 1997 in a 4–1 win over Fulham after returning from a short loan spell at Bath City. In his first season at Ninian Park, Rollo made seventeen appearances including playing in the play-off semi-final first leg defeat to Northampton Town.

The following season, he scored his first professional goal during his career with a header against Southend United in the League Cup on 12 August 1997. However, in doing so Rollo collided with the post and was taken to hospital after being knocked unconscious. He made just eight more appearances for the side before being allowed to leave at the end of the season following a loan spell in the Welsh Premier League with Ebbw Vale.

He moved to Forest Green Rovers, where he spent one season but struggled to hold down a place in the first team and returned to Bath City for a second spell on loan. After a two-year spell at Clevedon Town, during which the club suffered relegation, he spent one year with Merthyr Tydfil. Despite being offered the captaincy at the Welsh side, he decided to leave and returned to Bath City, this time on a permanent basis, in May 2002. He was awarded the club's player of the year award in the 2004–05 season and helped gain promotion to the Conference South in 2007 and to the Conference National in 2010.

Rollo stepped up in to a player-coach role at Bath for the 2012–13 season following a management reshuffle at the club. In December 2012, he left Bath after a decade of service and joined Chippenham Town. His time with Chippenham did not work out however and in March 2013 it was announced that Rollo had returned to Bath.

== Honours ==
Bath City

- Southern League Premier Division Winner: 1

2006–07

- Conference South Play-off Winner: 1

2009–10
