= 1955–56 Southern Football League =

The 1955–56 Southern Football League season was the 53rd in the history of the league, an English football competition.

No new clubs had joined the league for this season so the league consisted of 22 clubs from previous season. Guildford City were champions, winning their first Southern League title. Seven Southern League clubs applied to join the Football League at the end of the season, but none were successful.

== League table ==
Southern Football League
- Season: 1955–56
- Champions: Guildford City
- Matches: 462
- Goals: 1,720 (3.72 per match)

Pos	Team	Pld	W	D	L	GF	GA	GR	Pts
1	Guildford City	42	26	8	8	74	34	2.176	60
2	Cheltenham Town	42	25	6	11	82	53	1.547	56
3	Yeovil Town	42	23	9	10	98	55	1.782	55
4	Bedford Town	42	21	9	12	99	69	1.435	51
5	Dartford	42	20	9	13	78	62	1.258	49
6	Weymouth	42	19	10	13	83	63	1.317	48
7	Gloucester City	42	19	9	14	72	60	1.200	47
8	Lovells Athletic	42	19	9	14	91	78	1.167	47
9	Chelmsford City	42	18	10	14	67	55	1.218	46
10	Kettering Town	42	16	11	15	105	86	1.221	43
11	Exeter City II	42	17	9	16	75	76	0.987	43
12	Gravesend & Northfleet	42	17	8	17	79	75	1.053	42
13	Hereford United	42	17	7	18	90	90	1.000	41
14	Hastings United	42	15	10	17	90	73	1.233	40
15	Headington United	42	17	6	19	82	86	0.953	40
16	Kidderminster Harriers	42	14	7	21	86	108	0.796	35
17	Llanelly	42	14	6	22	64	98	0.653	34
18	Barry Town	42	11	11	20	91	108	0.843	33
19	Worcester City	42	12	9	21	66	83	0.795	33
20	Tonbridge	42	11	11	20	53	74	0.716	33
21	Merthyr Tydfil	42	7	10	25	52	127	0.409	24
22	Bath City	42	7	10	25	43	107	0.402	24

Source: rsssf.com
Rules for classification: 1) points; 2) goal ratio.

== Football League elections ==
Seven Southern League clubs applied for election to the Football League. However, none were successful as all four League clubs were re-elected.

Club	League	Votes
Bradford Park Avenue	Football League	47
Crewe Alexandra	Football League	45
Crystal Palace	Football League	44
Swindon Town	Football League	42
Peterborough United	Midland League	8
Wigan Athletic	Lancashire Combination	2
Boston United	Midland League	1
Burton Albion	Birmingham & District League	1
Gloucester City	Southern League	1
Nelson	Lancashire Combination	1
Bedford Town	Southern League	0
Chelmsford City	Southern League	0
Hastings United	Southern League	0
Headington United	Southern League	0
King's Lynn	Midland League	0
Worcester City	Southern League	0
Yeovil Town	Southern League	0
