= 1985–86 Southern Football League =

The 1985–86 Southern Football League season was the 83rd in the history of the league, an English football competition.

Welling United won the Premier Division and earned promotion to the Football Conference, whilst RS Southampton and Oldbury United left the league at the end of the season.

== Premier Division ==
The Premier Division consisted of 20 clubs, including 15 clubs from the previous season and five new clubs:

- Two clubs promoted from the Midland Division:
  - Aylesbury United
  - Dudley Town
- Two clubs promoted from the Southern Division:
  - Basingstoke Town
  - Gosport Borough
- Plus:
  - Worcester City, relegated from the Alliance Premier League

The Premier Division was to be expanded in the next season so only two clubs were to be relegated this season, though after RS Southampton resigned from the league, only Gravesend & Northfleet was relegated.

=== League table ===
Southern Football League Premier Division
- Season: 1985–86
- Champions: Welling United
- Promoted: Welling United
- Relegated: Gravesend & Northfleet
- Matches: 380
- Goals: 1,088 (2.86 per match)

Pos	Team	Pld	W	D	L	GF	GA	GD	Pts	Promotion or relegation
1	Welling United	38	29	6	3	95	31	+64	93	Promoted to the Football Conference
2	Chelmsford City	38	20	10	8	68	41	+27	70	
3	Fisher Athletic	38	20	7	11	67	45	+22	67	
4	Alvechurch	38	19	9	10	71	56	+15	66	
5	Worcester City	38	19	9	10	64	50	+14	66	
6	Crawley Town	38	18	5	15	76	59	+17	59	
7	Shepshed Charterhouse	38	19	1	18	51	52	−1	58	
8	Aylesbury United	38	14	10	14	52	49	+3	52	
9	Folkestone	38	14	10	14	56	56	0	52	
10	Bedworth United	38	14	8	16	44	49	−5	50	
11	Willenhall Town	38	12	13	13	51	44	+7	49	
12	Dudley Town	38	15	4	19	58	62	−4	49	
13	Corby Town	38	14	7	17	61	67	−6	49	
14	King's Lynn	38	12	10	16	39	42	−3	46	
15	Basingstoke Town	38	13	4	21	36	67	−31	43	
16	RS Southampton	38	11	9	18	44	61	−17	42	Resigned to the Wessex League
17	Witney Town	38	11	6	21	44	74	−30	39	
18	Gosport Borough	38	10	8	20	42	66	−24	38	
19	Fareham Town	38	8	13	17	40	62	−22	37	Reprieved from relegation
20	Gravesend & Northfleet	38	9	9	20	29	55	−26	36	Relegated to the Southern Division

Source: fchd.com rsssf.com
Rules for classification: 1) points; 2) goal difference; 3) number of goals scored.

== Midland Division ==
The Midland Division consisted of 21 clubs, including 16 clubs from the previous season and five new clubs:

- Two clubs relegated from the Premier Division:
  - Gloucester City
  - Leamington
- Plus:
  - Bilston Town, promoted from the West Midlands (Regional) League
  - Grantham, transferred from the Northern Premier League
  - Mile Oak Rovers, joined from the Midland Combination

=== League table ===
Southern Football League Midland Division
- Season: 1985–86
- Champions: Bromsgrove Rovers
- Promoted: Bromsgrove Rovers; Redditch United
- Relegated: Oldbury United
- Matches: 420
- Goals: 1,185 (2.82 per match)

Pos	Team	Pld	W	D	L	GF	GA	GD	Pts	Promotion or relegation
1	Bromsgrove Rovers	40	29	5	6	95	44	+51	92	Promoted to the Premier Division
2	Redditch United	40	23	6	11	70	42	+28	75	Promoted to the Premier Division
3	Merthyr Tydfil	40	21	10	9	60	40	+20	73	
4	VS Rugby	40	17	14	9	41	31	+10	65	
5	Stourbridge	40	15	14	11	62	39	+23	59	
6	Rushden Town	40	17	7	16	69	74	−5	58	
7	Bilston Town	40	15	12	13	60	48	+12	57	
8	Bridgnorth Town	40	13	18	9	56	45	+11	57	
9	Gloucester City	40	15	12	13	61	57	+4	57	
10	Grantham	40	16	7	17	46	59	−13	55	
11	Wellingborough Town	40	15	9	16	56	56	0	54	
12	Sutton Coldfield Town	40	13	14	13	60	45	+15	53	
13	Hednesford Town	40	14	9	17	67	70	−3	51	
14	Forest Green Rovers	40	14	9	17	52	56	−4	51	
15	Mile Oak Rovers	40	14	8	18	56	73	−17	50	
16	Leicester United	40	13	10	17	41	48	−7	49	
17	Banbury United	40	13	8	19	38	55	−17	47	
18	Coventry Sporting	40	10	15	15	42	48	−6	45	
19	Moor Green	40	12	6	22	63	91	−28	42	
20	Leamington	40	10	6	24	40	77	−37	36	
21	Oldbury United	40	8	7	25	50	87	−37	31	Relegated to the West Midlands (Regional) League

Source: fchd.com rsssf.com
Rules for classification: 1) points; 2) goal difference; 3) number of goals scored.

== Southern Division ==
The Southern Division expanded up to 21 clubs, including 16 clubs from the previous season and five new clubs:

- Corinthian
- Hastings Town, new club replaced the folded Hastings United
- Ruislip, promoted from the Middlesex County League
- Trowbridge Town, relegated from the Premier Division

Also, at the end of the previous season Hillingdon merged with London Spartan League club Burnham to form a new club Burnham & Hillingdon, who took over a place in the Southern Football League.

=== League table ===
Southern Football League Southern Division
- Season: 1985–86
- Champions: Cambridge City
- Promoted: Cambridge City; Salisbury
- Matches: 420
- Goals: 1,259 (3 per match)

Pos	Team	Pld	W	D	L	GF	GA	GD	Pts	Promotion or relegation
1	Cambridge City	40	23	11	6	87	41	+46	80	Promoted to the Premier Division
2	Salisbury	40	24	8	8	84	51	+33	80	Promoted to the Premier Division
3	Hastings Town	40	23	9	8	83	51	+32	78	
4	Dover Athletic	40	23	6	11	89	53	+36	75	
5	Corinthian	40	20	9	11	78	45	+33	69	
6	Tonbridge	40	17	13	10	65	51	+14	64	
7	Dunstable	40	17	11	12	70	61	+9	62	
8	Ruislip	40	17	6	17	67	66	+1	57	
9	Erith & Belvedere	40	14	12	14	35	40	−5	54	
10	Waterlooville	40	16	6	18	52	58	−6	54	
11	Burnham & Hillingdon	40	16	6	18	44	59	−15	54	
12	Canterbury City	40	13	13	14	58	58	0	52	
13	Trowbridge Town	40	13	13	14	57	63	−6	52	
14	Sheppey United	40	14	10	16	43	53	−10	52	
15	Thanet United	40	13	7	20	58	63	−5	46	
16	Woodford Town	40	12	10	18	49	62	−13	46	
17	Poole Town	40	12	7	21	55	63	−8	43	
18	Ashford Town (Kent)	40	10	12	18	45	65	−20	42	
19	Chatham Town	40	8	15	17	53	70	−17	39	
20	Andover	40	10	8	22	52	92	−40	38	
21	Dorchester Town	40	5	8	27	35	94	−59	23	

Source: fchd.com rsssf.com
Rules for classification: 1) points; 2) goal difference; 3) number of goals scored.

== See also ==
- Southern Football League
- 1985–86 Isthmian League
- 1985–86 Northern Premier League
