= 1981–82 Southern Football League =

The 1981–82 Southern Football League season was the 79th in the history of the league, an English football competition.

The league was split into Midland and Southern Divisions for a third and final season, at the end of it league restructuring for the forthcoming season meant that the top ten in each division (minus promoted clubs) would remain at the sixth level in a new Premier Division, whilst clubs finishing lower would be relegated to the seventh level.

Nuneaton Borough won the Midland Division, whilst Wealdstone won the Southern Division, both earning promotion to the Alliance Premier League, having both also been relegated from the APL the previous season. Wealdstone were declared Southern League champions after defeating Nuneaton on penalties, after the two championship play-offs had finished 2–2 on aggregate (Wealdstone won 2–1 at home and Nuneaton won 1–0). They completed the double by also winning the Southern League Cup.

At the end of the season Bedford Town folded, whilst Barry Town left to join the Welsh Football League.

== Midland Division ==
The Midland Division consisted of 22 clubs, including 21 clubs from the previous season and one new club:

- Nuneaton Borough, relegated from the Alliance Premier League

=== League table ===
Southern Football League Midland Division
- Season: 1981–82
- Champions: Nuneaton Borough
- Promoted: Nuneaton Borough
- Relegated: 11 clubs
- Matches: 462
- Goals: 1,295 (2.8 per match)

Pos	Team	Pld	W	D	L	GF	GA	GD	Pts	Promotion or relegation
1	Nuneaton Borough	42	27	11	4	88	32	+56	65	Promoted to the Alliance Premier League
2	Alvechurch	42	26	10	6	79	34	+45	62	
3	Kidderminster Harriers	42	22	12	8	71	40	+31	56	
4	Stourbridge	42	21	10	11	69	47	+22	52	
5	Gloucester City	42	21	9	12	64	48	+16	51	
6	Bedworth United	42	20	10	12	59	40	+19	50	
7	Enderby Town	42	20	10	12	79	66	+13	50	
8	Witney Town	42	19	8	15	71	49	+22	46	
9	Barry Town	42	16	14	12	59	46	+13	46	Left to join Welsh Football League
10	Corby Town	42	19	8	15	70	59	+11	46	
11	Merthyr Tydfil	42	16	12	14	63	54	+9	44	Relegated to the Midland Division
12	Wellingborough Town	42	15	12	15	50	45	+5	42	Relegated to the Midland Division
13	Bridgend Town	42	13	13	16	50	62	−12	39	Relegated to the Midland Division
14	Bromsgrove Rovers	42	15	8	19	57	63	−6	38	Relegated to the Midland Division
15	Bedford Town	42	12	13	17	45	54	−9	37	Folded at end of season
16	Cheltenham Town	42	11	14	17	65	68	−3	36	Relegated to the Midland Division
17	Taunton Town	42	12	8	22	46	76	−30	32	Relegated to the Midland Division
18	Banbury United	42	11	8	23	63	91	−28	30	Relegated to the Midland Division
19	Minehead	42	12	6	24	38	69	−31	30	Relegated to the Midland Division
20	Cambridge City	42	10	8	24	38	80	−42	28	Relegated to the Midland Division
21	Milton Keynes City	42	6	11	25	34	70	−36	23	Relegated to the Midland Division
22	Redditch United	42	8	5	29	37	102	−65	21	Relegated to the Midland Division

Source: fchd.com rsssf.com
Rules for classification: 1) points; 2) goal difference; 3) number of goals scored.

== Southern Division ==
The Southern Division consisted of 24 clubs, including 22 clubs from the previous season and two new clubs:

- Wealdstone, relegated from the Alliance Premier League
- Welling United, joined from the Athenian League

At the end of the previous season, Margate had been renamed Thanet United.

=== League table ===
Southern Football League Southern Division
- Season: 1981–82
- Champions: Wealdstone
- Promoted: Wealdstone
- Relegated: 14 clubs
- Matches: 552
- Goals: 1,541 (2.79 per match)

Pos	Team	Pld	W	D	L	GF	GA	GD	Pts	Promotion or relegation
1	Wealdstone	46	32	8	6	100	32	+68	72	Promoted to the Alliance Premier League
2	Hastings United	46	31	9	6	79	34	+45	71	
3	Dorchester Town	46	21	18	7	76	41	+35	60	
4	Gosport Borough	46	26	8	12	76	45	+31	60	
5	Fareham Town	46	20	14	12	58	48	+10	54	
6	Poole Town	46	19	15	12	92	63	+29	53	
7	Waterlooville	46	22	9	15	75	53	+22	53	
8	Welling United	46	19	13	14	70	48	+22	51	
9	Addlestone & Weybridge	46	17	17	12	71	53	+18	51	
10	Chelmsford City	46	20	11	15	64	53	+11	51	
11	Aylesbury United	46	19	12	15	79	61	+18	50	Relegated to the Southern Division
12	Basingstoke Town	46	18	12	16	74	61	+13	48	Relegated to the Southern Division
13	Dover	46	19	8	19	61	63	−2	46	Relegated to the Southern Division
14	Ashford Town (Kent)	46	16	14	16	52	56	−4	46	Relegated to the Southern Division
15	Tonbridge	46	19	7	20	62	70	−8	45	Relegated to the Southern Division
16	Dunstable	46	18	8	20	63	68	−5	44	Relegated to the Southern Division
17	Salisbury	46	16	10	20	64	81	−17	42	Relegated to the Southern Division
18	Hounslow	46	15	11	20	59	83	−24	41	Relegated to the Southern Division
19	Hillingdon Borough	46	14	10	22	46	58	−12	38	Relegated to the Southern Division
20	Canterbury City	46	10	16	20	49	78	−29	36	Relegated to the Southern Division
21	Crawley Town	46	9	12	25	46	81	−35	30	Relegated to the Southern Division
22	Folkestone	46	10	6	30	49	101	−52	26	Relegated to the Southern Division
23	Andover	46	4	11	31	39	100	−61	19	Relegated to the Southern Division
24	Thanet United	46	5	7	34	37	110	−73	17	Relegated to the Southern Division

Source: fchd.com rsssf.com
Rules for classification: 1) points; 2) goal difference; 3) number of goals scored.

== See also ==
- Southern Football League
- 1981–82 Isthmian League
- 1981–82 Northern Premier League
