= 1984–85 Southern Football League =

The 1984–85 Southern Football League season was the 82nd in the history of the league, an English football competition.

== Premier Division ==
The Premier Division consisted of 20 clubs, including 15 clubs from the previous season and five new clubs:

- Two clubs promoted from the Midland Division:
  - Shepshed Charterhouse
  - Willenhall Town
- Two clubs promoted from the Southern Division:
  - Crawley Town
  - Road-Sea Southampton
- Plus:
  - Trowbridge Town, relegated from the Alliance Premier League

=== League table ===
Southern Football League Premier Division
- Season: 1984–85
- Champions: Cheltenham Town
- Promoted: Cheltenham Town
- Relegated: AP Leamington; Gloucester City; Trowbridge Town
- Matches: 380
- Goals: 1,144 (3.01 per match)

Pos	Team	Pld	W	D	L	GF	GA	GD	Pts	Promotion or relegation
1	Cheltenham Town	38	24	5	9	83	41	+42	77	Promoted to the Alliance Premier League
2	King's Lynn	38	23	6	9	73	48	+25	75	
3	Crawley Town	38	22	8	8	76	52	+24	74	
4	Willenhall Town	38	20	8	10	57	38	+19	68	
5	Road-Sea Southampton	38	21	4	13	76	52	+24	67	
6	Welling United	38	18	11	9	55	38	+17	65	
7	Folkestone	38	19	6	13	70	54	+16	63	
8	Fisher Athletic	38	19	5	14	67	57	+10	62	
9	Chelmsford City	38	17	10	11	52	50	+2	61	
10	Shepshed Charterhouse	38	18	5	15	67	50	+17	59	
11	Corby Town	38	15	6	17	56	54	+2	51	
12	Bedworth United	38	14	8	16	48	52	−4	50	
13	Gravesend & Northfleet	38	12	12	14	46	46	0	48	
14	Fareham Town	38	13	8	17	52	55	−3	47	
15	Alvechurch	38	11	7	20	53	59	−6	40	
16	Hastings United	38	11	7	20	46	71	−25	40	Club folded
17	Witney Town	38	9	12	17	51	58	−7	39	Reprieved from relegation
18	Gloucester City	38	10	6	22	49	74	−25	36	Relegated to the Midland Division
19	Trowbridge Town	38	10	5	23	45	83	−38	35	Relegated to the Southern Division
20	AP Leamington	38	2	5	31	22	112	−90	11	Relegated to the Midland Division

Source: fchd.com rsssf.com
Rules for classification: 1) points; 2) goal difference; 3) number of goals scored.

== Midland Division ==
The Midland Division consisted of 19 clubs, including 16 clubs from the previous season and three new clubs:

- Hednesford Town, joined from the West Midlands (Regional) League
- Stourbridge, relegated from the Premier Division
- Sutton Coldfield Town, relegated from the Premier Division

=== League table ===
Southern Football League Midland Division
- Season: 1984–85
- Champions: Dudley Town
- Promoted: Aylesbury United; Dudley Town
- Matches: 306
- Goals: 922 (3.01 per match)

Pos	Team	Pld	W	D	L	GF	GA	GD	Pts	Promotion or relegation
1	Dudley Town	34	21	8	5	70	36	+34	71	Promoted to the Premier Division
2	Aylesbury United	34	20	7	7	62	30	+32	67	Promoted to the Premier Division
3	Hednesford Town	34	18	7	9	58	42	+16	61	
4	Moor Green	34	17	9	8	63	43	+20	60	
5	VS Rugby	34	17	9	8	59	41	+18	60	
6	Bromsgrove Rovers	34	16	10	8	53	42	+11	58	
7	Stourbridge	34	15	11	8	52	45	+7	56	
8	Redditch United	34	12	11	11	68	57	+11	47	
9	Sutton Coldfield Town	34	13	6	15	50	56	−6	45	
10	Bridgnorth Town	34	13	5	16	67	65	+2	44	
11	Coventry Sporting	34	11	9	14	45	52	−7	42	
12	Merthyr Tydfil	34	10	11	13	43	46	−3	41	
13	Rushden Town	34	10	7	17	42	52	−10	37	
14	Forest Green Rovers	34	9	10	15	49	65	−16	37	
15	Wellingborough Town	34	10	7	17	39	63	−24	37	
16	Oldbury United	34	10	6	18	52	66	−14	36	
17	Banbury United	34	9	5	20	33	59	−26	32	
18	Leicester United	34	3	6	25	17	62	−45	15	
19	Milton Keynes City	0	0	0	0	0	0	0	0	Club folded, record expunged

Source: fchd.com rsssf.com
Rules for classification: 1) points; 2) goal difference; 3) number of goals scored.

== Southern Division ==
The Southern Division consisted of 20 clubs, including 17 clubs from the previous season and three new clubs:

- Dorchester Town, relegated from the Premier Division
- Gosport Borough, relegated from the Premier Division
- Sheppey United, joined from the Kent Football League

Also, at the end of the previous season Hillingdon Borough was renamed Hillingdon.

At the end of the season Hillingdon merged with London Spartan League club Burnham to form a new club Burnham & Hillingdon, who took over a place in the Southern Football League.

=== League table ===
Southern Football League Southern Division
- Season: 1984–85
- Champions: Basingstoke Town
- Promoted: Basingstoke Town; Gosport Borough
- Matches: 380
- Goals: 1,085 (2.86 per match)

Pos	Team	Pld	W	D	L	GF	GA	GD	Pts	Promotion or relegation
1	Basingstoke Town	38	24	9	5	61	22	+39	81	Promoted to the Premier Division
2	Gosport Borough	38	22	6	10	78	41	+37	72	Promoted to the Premier Division
3	Poole Town	38	20	12	6	69	38	+31	72	
4	Hillingdon	38	19	10	9	51	23	+28	67	Merged into Burnham & Hillingdon
5	Thanet United	38	19	9	10	63	47	+16	66	
6	Salisbury	38	19	5	14	55	54	+1	62	
7	Sheppey United	38	18	6	14	49	45	+4	60	
8	Addlestone & Weybridge Town	38	16	9	13	68	54	+14	57	Club folded
9	Waterlooville	38	15	10	13	71	63	+8	55	
10	Canterbury City	38	15	7	16	61	64	−3	52	
11	Woodford Town	38	13	13	12	46	53	−7	52	
12	Tonbridge	38	16	3	19	59	62	−3	51	
13	Andover	38	15	5	18	42	54	−12	50	
14	Dorchester Town	38	13	7	18	45	60	−15	46	
15	Cambridge City	38	11	11	16	59	71	−12	44	
16	Chatham Town	38	12	8	18	44	66	−22	44	
17	Ashford Town (Kent)	38	10	9	19	54	69	−15	39	
18	Dunstable	38	8	10	20	35	56	−21	34	
19	Dover Athletic	38	7	7	24	39	78	−39	28	
20	Erith & Belvedere	38	6	8	24	36	65	−29	26	

Source: fchd.com rsssf.com
Rules for classification: 1) points; 2) goal difference; 3) number of goals scored.

== See also ==
- Southern Football League
- 1984–85 Isthmian League
- 1984–85 Northern Premier League
