= 1983–84 Southern Football League =

The 1983–84 Southern Football League season was the 81st in the history of the league, an English football competition.

Dartford won the Premier Division, winning their fourth Southern League title and were promoted to the Alliance Premier League, while Shepshed Charterhouse, Willenhall Town and Road-Sea Southampton were promoted to the Premier Division for the first time in their history along with Crawley Town, who returned after 15 seasons.

== Premier Division ==
The Premier Division consisted of 20 clubs, including 15 clubs from the previous season and five new clubs:

- Two clubs promoted from the Midland Division:
  - Cheltenham Town
  - Sutton Coldfield Town
- Two clubs promoted from the Southern Division:
  - Fisher Athletic
  - Folkestone
- Plus:
  - King's Lynn, transferred from the Northern Premier League

=== League table ===
Southern Football League Premier Division
- Season: 1983–84
- Champions: Dartford
- Promoted: Dartford
- Relegated: Dorchester Town; Gosport Borough; Stourbridge; Sutton Coldfield Town
- Matches: 380
- Goals: 1,125 (2.96 per match)

Pos	Team	Pld	W	D	L	GF	GA	GD	Pts	Promotion or relegation
1	Dartford	38	23	9	6	67	32	+35	78	Promoted to the Alliance Premier League
2	Fisher Athletic	38	22	9	7	80	42	+38	75	
3	Chelmsford City	38	19	9	10	67	45	+22	66	
4	Gravesend & Northfleet	38	18	9	11	50	38	+12	63	
5	Witney Town	38	18	6	14	75	50	+25	60	
6	King's Lynn	38	18	6	14	42	45	−3	60	
7	Folkestone	38	16	9	13	60	56	+4	57	
8	Cheltenham Town	38	16	7	15	63	56	+7	55	
9	Gloucester City	38	13	15	10	55	50	+5	54	
10	Hastings United	38	15	9	14	55	57	−2	54	
11	Bedworth United	38	15	9	14	51	55	−4	54	
12	Welling United	38	15	7	16	61	61	0	52	
13	AP Leamington	38	14	9	15	73	83	−10	51	
14	Corby Town	38	12	14	12	55	54	+1	50	
15	Fareham Town	38	13	11	14	65	70	−5	50	
16	Alvechurch	38	12	12	14	56	63	−7	48	
17	Sutton Coldfield Town	38	10	14	14	49	53	−4	44	Relegated to the Midland Division
18	Gosport Borough	38	6	15	17	31	64	−33	33	Relegated to the Southern Division
19	Dorchester Town	38	4	8	26	40	69	−29	20	Relegated to the Southern Division
20	Stourbridge	38	4	7	27	30	82	−52	19	Relegated to the Midland Division

Source: fchd.com rsssf.com
Rules for classification: 1) points; 2) goal difference; 3) number of goals scored.

== Midland Division ==
The Midland Division expanded up to 20 clubs, including 12 clubs from the previous season and eight new clubs:

- Two clubs joined from the Midland Football Combination:
  - Bridgnorth Town
  - Moor Green
- Two clubs joined from the West Midlands (Regional) League:
  - Coventry Sporting
  - VS Rugby
- Plus:
  - Enderby Town, relegated from the Premier Division and changed name to Leicester United
  - Rushden Town, promoted from the United Counties League
  - Shepshed Charterhouse, promoted from the Northern Counties East League
  - Tamworth, relegated from the Northern Premier League

=== League table ===
Southern Football League Midland Division
- Season: 1983–84
- Champions: Willenhall Town
- Promoted: Shepshed Charterhouse; Willenhall Town
- Relegated: Tamworth
- Matches: 380
- Goals: 1,180 (3.11 per match)

Pos	Team	Pld	W	D	L	GF	GA	GD	Pts	Promotion or relegation
1	Willenhall Town	38	27	4	7	100	44	+56	85	Promoted to the Premier Division
2	Shepshed Charterhouse	38	25	5	8	88	37	+51	80	Promoted to the Premier Division
3	Bromsgrove Rovers	38	20	8	10	73	43	+30	68	
4	Dudley Town	38	18	13	7	71	43	+28	67	
5	Aylesbury United	38	17	15	6	62	35	+27	66	
6	Moor Green	38	18	12	8	63	44	+19	66	
7	Rushden Town	38	17	12	9	68	42	+26	63	
8	Merthyr Tydfil	38	18	8	12	63	44	+19	62	
9	Redditch United	38	17	9	12	67	67	0	60	
10	VS Rugby	38	15	12	11	68	51	+17	57	
11	Forest Green Rovers	38	15	12	11	67	51	+16	57	
12	Bridgnorth Town	38	16	9	13	64	52	+12	57	
13	Leicester United	38	12	9	17	58	58	0	45	
14	Oldbury United	38	10	13	15	53	51	+2	43	
15	Coventry Sporting	38	11	7	20	40	67	−27	40	
16	Bridgwater Town	38	10	8	20	39	65	−26	38	Club folded
17	Wellingborough Town	38	7	9	22	43	80	−37	30	
18	Banbury United	38	6	11	21	37	78	−41	29	
19	Milton Keynes City	38	3	9	26	31	110	−79	18	
20	Tamworth	38	2	7	29	25	118	−93	13	Relegated to the West Midlands (Regional) League

Source: fchd.com rsssf.com
Rules for classification: 1) points; 2) goal difference; 3) number of goals scored.

== Southern Division ==
The Midland Division expanded up to 20 clubs, including 15 clubs from the previous season and five new clubs:

- Three clubs relegated from the Premier Division:
  - Addlestone & Weybridge Town
  - Poole Town
  - Waterlooville
- Plus:
  - Chatham Town, joined from the Kent Football League
  - Dover Athletic, new club formed after Dover folded

At the end of the season Hillingdon Borough was renamed Hillingdon.

=== League table ===
Southern Football League Southern Division
- Season: 1983–84
- Champions: Road-Sea Southampton
- Promoted: Crawley Town; Road-Sea Southampton
- Relegated: Hounslow
- Matches: 380
- Goals: 1,017 (2.68 per match)

Pos	Team	Pld	W	D	L	GF	GA	GD	Pts	Promotion or relegation
1	Road-Sea Southampton	38	26	6	6	83	35	+48	84	Promoted to the Premier Division
2	Crawley Town	38	22	9	7	68	28	+40	75	Promoted to the Premier Division
3	Basingstoke Town	38	20	9	9	54	36	+18	69	
4	Tonbridge	38	20	9	9	61	44	+17	69	
5	Addlestone & Weybridge Town	38	19	11	8	58	34	+24	68	
6	Poole Town	38	20	7	11	68	42	+26	67	
7	Hillingdon Borough	38	18	11	9	43	20	+23	65	
8	Ashford Town (Kent)	38	19	5	14	65	47	+18	62	
9	Salisbury	38	17	8	13	61	48	+13	59	
10	Cambridge City	38	13	9	16	43	53	−10	48	
11	Canterbury City	38	12	9	17	44	52	−8	45	
12	Waterlooville	38	12	9	17	56	69	−13	45	
13	Dover Athletic	38	12	9	17	51	74	−23	45	
14	Chatham Town	38	11	10	17	46	56	−10	43	
15	Andover	38	12	6	20	35	54	−19	42	
16	Erith & Belvedere	38	11	9	18	43	68	−25	42	
17	Dunstable	38	10	8	20	38	65	−27	38	
18	Thanet United	38	9	8	21	40	65	−25	35	
19	Woodford Town	38	7	8	23	30	69	−39	29	
20	Hounslow	38	4	12	22	30	58	−28	24	Relegated to the Hellenic Football League

Source: fchd.com rsssf.com
Rules for classification: 1) points; 2) goal difference; 3) number of goals scored.

== See also ==
- Southern Football League
- 1983–84 Isthmian League
- 1983–84 Northern Premier League
