= Basingstoke Town F.C. =

English football club

Coordinates: 51.2679°N 1.1119°W

- Full name: Basingstoke Town Football Club
- Nicknames: The 'Stoke,
- Founded: 1896
- Ground: Winklebury Sports Complex, Basingstoke
- Capacity: 2,000
- Chairman: Jack Miller
- Manager: Dan Brownlie
- League: Southern League Premier Division South
- 2025–26: Southern League Premier Division South, 17th of 22
Home colours	Away colours

Basingstoke Town Football Club is a football club based in Basingstoke, Hampshire, England. The club are currently members of the Southern League Premier Division South and play at the Winklebury Sports Complex. Their motto, 'Vestigia Nulla Retrorsum', means 'Never a step backward'.

== History ==
The club was established in 1896 by a merger of Aldworth United and Basingstoke Albion. They joined the Hampshire League in 1901, and when the league was split into geographical divisions in 1903, were placed in the North Division. They finished bottom of the division in both 1903–04 and 1904–05, and again in 1906–07 and 1907–08. However, after consecutive second-bottom finishes and then finishing fifth out of seven clubs in 1910–11, they were North Division champions in 1911–12.

Finishing as champions resulted in promotion to the County Section, although the club continued to play in the North Division. They won the North Section again in 1919–20, After league reorganisation in 1929 Basingstoke were placed in Division One. They finished as runners-up in 1965–66 and 1966–67, before winning the league in 1967–68. After finishing as runners-up again in 1968–69, they won back-to-back titles in 1969–70 and 1970–71, remaining unbeaten in the latter season. They club also won the Hampshire Senior Cup for the first time in 1970–71, beating Fareham Town 3–2 in a replay after the original final ended 1–1.

After their third Hampshire League title in 1971, Basingstoke moved up to Division One South of the Southern League. Their first season in the Southern League saw them reach the first round of the FA Cup for the first time, eventually losing 5–1 to Northampton Town. The club remained in Division One South until 1979, when league restructuring saw them placed in the Southern Division. They won the division in 1984–85, earning promotion to the Premier Division. Two seasons later they were transferred to the Premier Division of the Isthmian League. Although they were relegated to Division One at the end of the 1987–88 season, they made an immediate return to the Premier Division after finishing as Division One runners-up the following season.

The 1989–90 season saw Basingstoke reach the first round of the FA Cup again. After beating Bromsgrove Rovers 3–0, they lost 3–2 to Torquay United in the second round. They also won the Hampshire Senior Cup, beating AFC Lymington 8–0 in the final. In 1993–94 they were relegated to Division One. They won the Hampshire Senior Cup again in 1995–96 and 1996–97, beating Waterlooville 2–0 in the final on both occasions. The latter season also saw them return to the Premier Division after finishing as runners-up in Division One. The following season saw them reach the first round of the FA Cup and defeat Football League opposition for the first time, beating Wycombe Wanderers 5–4 on penalties after a 2–2 draw in a replay; the attendance of 5,085 was a new record for the club. They then took Northampton to a replay in the second round, before losing 4–3 on penalties. They reached the first round again in 1998–99, losing 2–1 to AFC Bournemouth.

In 2003–04 the club finished fourteenth in the Premier Division, entering a play-off against Lewes for a place in the new Conference South. Although they lost 4–1, they gained a place in the new league after Hendon decided against promotion. The club made another appearance in the FA Cup first round in 2006–07, beating League One club Chesterfield 1–0 at Saltergate before losing 3–1 to local rivals Aldershot in a second round replay. The Hampshire Senior Cup was won again in 2007–08 with a 1–0 win over Farnborough in the final. A fifth-place finish in 2011–12 saw the club qualify for the promotion play-offs. However, they lost the two-legged semi-final to Dartford 3–1 on aggregate, losing 1–0 at home and 2–1 away. They also reached the FA Cup first round again, losing 1–0 to Brentford. They qualified for the play-offs for a second time in 2014–15 after finishing third, but were beaten 2–1 on aggregate by Whitehawk in the semi-finals. However, the club did win the Hampshire Senior Cup again, beating Havant & Waterlooville 3–2 after extra time in the final.

The following season saw Basingstoke make another appearance in the FA Cup first round, a 1–0 defeat at Cambridge United; however, after finishing bottom of the renamed National League South, they were relegated to the Premier Division of the Southern League. In 2016–17 the club won the Hampshire Senior Cup, beating AFC Bournemouth 7–6 on penalties after the final ended in a 0–0 draw. They were placed in the Premier South division at the end of the 2017–18 season as part of the restructuring of the non-League pyramid. The club finished third-from-bottom of the division in 2018–19 and were relegated to Division One South. At the end of the 2020–21 season they were transferred to the South Central Division of the Isthmian League. The 2021–22 season saw them finish fifth, qualifying for the promotion play-offs. They went on to lose 4–1 to Chertsey Town in the semi-finals. In 2022–23 the club were South Central Division champions, earning promotion, as well as winning the North Hampshire Senior Cup with a 3–1 win over Romsey Town and the Hampshire Senior Cup with a 1–0 win against AFC Bournemouth. They won the North Hampshire Senior Cup again in 2023–24, beating Romsey Town 4–3 in the final. The 2024–25 season saw a third consecutive North Hampshire Senior Cup final against Romsey Town, with Basingstoke winning 6–0. In April 2026, Basingstoke won the Hampshire County Cup for the ninth time.

== Ground ==
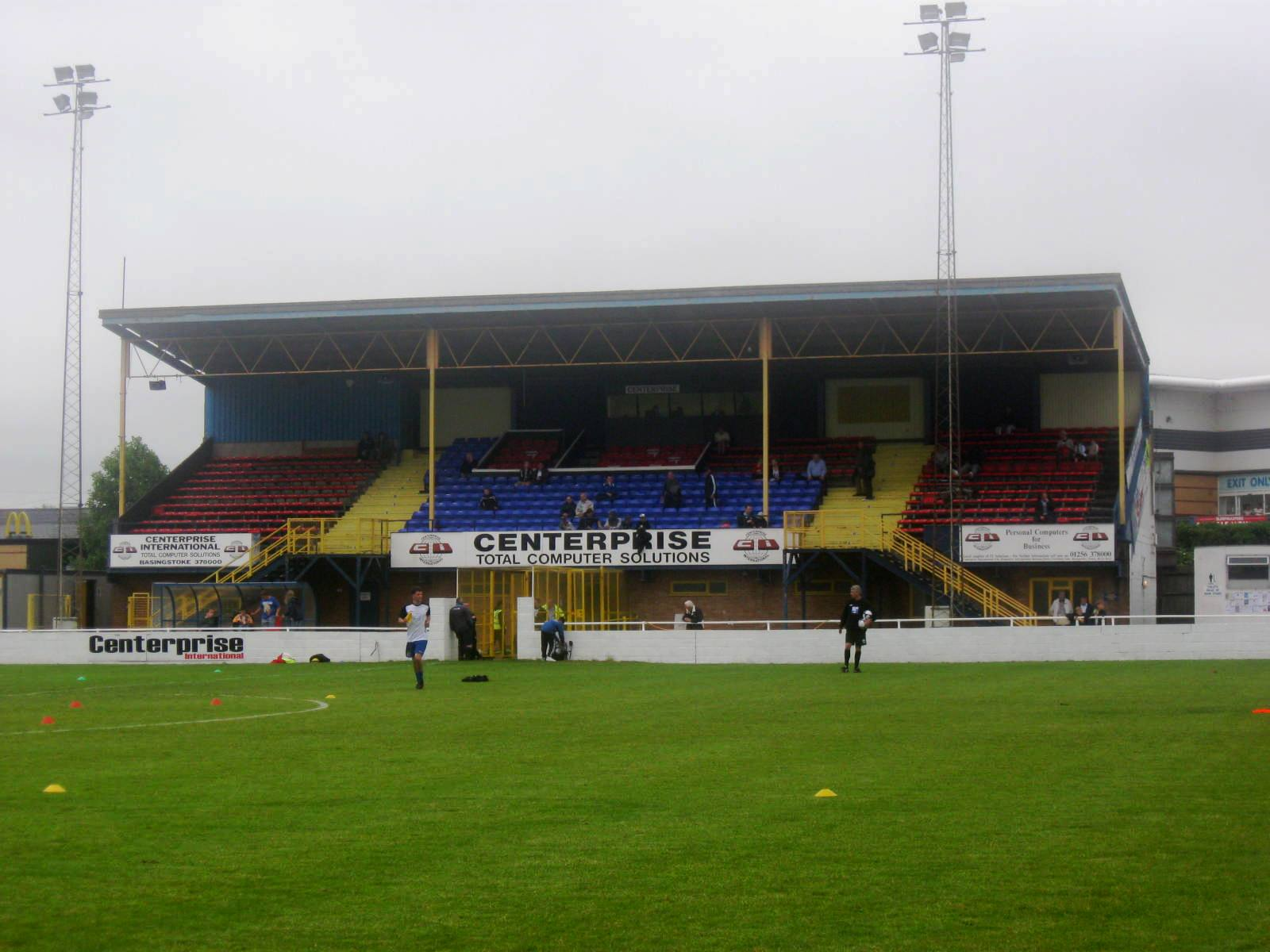
The main stand at the Camrose

The club played at Castlefields from their establishment until 1945, when a site for a new ground was offered to them by Lord Camrose. The new ground was initially known as Winchester Road, and consisted of a small wooden stand together with grass banking with some terracing. The first match was played on 1 December 1945 against Southampton Borough Police, and the ground was later renamed after Lord Camrose.

A new clubhouse was built in 1969 and a new main stand in 1970. Terracing was also added to the ground and floodlights erected. A roof was later installed over the terracing opposite the stand, with another terrace built next to the stand. The ground's record attendance of 5,085 was set in 1997 for an FA Cup first round match against Wycombe Wanderers. It currently has a capacity of 6,000, of which 651 is seated and 2,000 covered.

In 2019 the club was forced to relocate to Winchester City's City Ground as former chairman Rafi Razzak attempted to sell the Camrose for development. In October 2020 the club returned to Basingstoke, at the upgraded FA Winklebury Sports Complex in the Winklebury area of the town.

== Club staff ==
First team

- Manager: Dan Brownlie
- Assistant Manager: Aaron Nicholson
- Coach: Paul Worsfold
- Coach: Jon Boardman
- Physiotherapist: Seanagh McCarthy
- Goalkeeper Coach: Geraint Holliman & Lance Forster

Academy

- Academy Manager: Aaron Nicholson
- Academy Coach: Ben Cook

== Honours ==
- Isthmian League
  - South Central Division champions 2022–23
- Southern League
  - Southern Division champions 1984–85
- Hampshire League
  - Division One champions 1967–68, 1968–69, 1970–71
  - North Division champions 1911–12, 1919–20
- Hampshire Senior Cup
  - Winners 1970–71, 1989–90, 1995–96, 1996–97, 2007–08, 2013–14, 2016–17, 2022–23, 2025–26
- North Hampshire Senior Cup
  - Winners 2022–23, 2023–24, 2024–25
- Remembrance Cup
  - Winners 2005, 2006

== Records ==
- Best league finish: 3rd place in 6th tier, Isthmian League Premier Division 2000-01, Conference South 2014–15
- Best FA Cup performance: Second round, 1989–90, 1997–98, 2006–07
- Best FA Trophy performance: Third round, 1998–99, 2003–04
- Most appearances: Billy Coombs (1980s)
- Most goals: Paul Coombs 159 (1991–99)
- Biggest win: 10–1 vs Chichester City, FA Cup first qualifying round, 1976
- Heaviest defeat: 8–0 vs Aylesbury United, Southern League Division One South, April 1979
- Record attendance: 5,085 vs Wycombe Wanderers, FA Cup first round, November 1997
  - Record league attendance: 2,810 vs Aldershot Town, Isthmian League Premier Division 26 December 1998
- Record transfer fee paid: £4,750 to Gosport Borough for Steve Ingman

== Season-by-Season ==
Season	Level on pyramid	Division	P	W	D	L	F	A	Pts	Pos	FA Cup	FA Trophy	Notes
2025-26	7	Southern League Premier Division South	42	14	9	19	61	71	51	17/22	First qualifying round	First round	
2024-25	7	Southern League Premier Division South	42	11	15	16	62	64	48	15/22	First qualifying round	Third qualifying round	
2023-24	7	Southern League Premier Division South	42	15	8	19	69	83	53	12/22	First qualifying round	Second round	
2022-23	8	Isthmian League South Central Division	38	29	2	7	89	37	89	1/20	First qualifying round	First qualifying round	Promoted
2021-22	8	Isthmian League South Central Division	36	21	7	8	65	49	70	5/19	Second qualifying round	Second qualifying round	Lost in play-off semi-final
2020-21	8	Southern League Division One South	7	5	1	1	23	13	16	3/20	Preliminary round	Second qualifying round	Season abandoned due to COVID-19 pandemic
2019-20	8	Southern League Division One South	27	5	4	18	34	76	18	19/20	Preliminary round	First qualifying round	One point deducted. Season abandoned due to COVID-19 pandemic
2018-19	7	Southern League Premier Division South	42	14	7	21	81	82	49	20/22	Second qualifying round	Third qualifying round	Relegated
2017-18	7	Southern League Premier Division	46	21	8	17	92	72	71	10/24	First qualifying round	First qualifying round	
2016-17	7	Southern League Premier Division	46	18	8	20	65	72	62	12/24	Second Qualifying round	Third qualifying round	
2015-16	6	National League South	42	9	11	22	46	69	38	22/22	First round	Third qualifying round	Relegated
2014-15	6	Conference South	40	22	7	11	67	43	73	3/21	First round	First round	Lost in play-off semi-final
2013-14	6	Conference South	42	15	8	19	55	56	53	14/22	Second qualifying round	First round	
2012-13	6	Conference South	42	12	12	18	63	73	48	14/22	Third qualifying round	Third Qualifying round	
2011-12	6	Conference South	42	20	11	11	65	50	71	5/22	First round	Second round	Lost in play-off semi-final
2010-11	6	Conference South	42	13	10	19	50	63	49	13/22	Fourth qualifying round	First round	
2009-10	6	Conference South	42	13	10	9	49	68	49	15/22	Third qualifying round	Third qualifying round	
2008-09	6	Conference South	42	10	16	16	36	55	46	18/22	Fourth qualifying round	Second round	
2007-08	6	Conference South	42	12	14	16	54	75	50	15/22	Second qualifying round	Third qualifying round	
2006-07	6	Conference South	42	9	16	17	46	58	43	19/22	Second round	First round	
2005-06	6	Conference South	42	12	8	22	47	72	44	19/22	Fourth qualifying round	Third qualifying round	
2004-05	6	Conference South	42	19	6	17	57	52	63	6/22	Second qualifying round	First round	
2003-04	6	Isthmian League Premier Division	46	17	9	20	58	64	60	14/24	Third qualifying round	Third round	
2002-03	6	Isthmian League Premier Division	46	23	7	16	80	60	76	5/24	Second qualifying round	Second round	
2001-02	6	Isthmian League Premier Division	42	11	15	16	50	68	48	18/22	Fourth qualifying round	Second round	
2000-01	6	Isthmian League Premier Division	42	22	13	7	73	40	79	3/22	Second qualifying round	First round	
1999-00	6	Isthmian League Premier Division	42	13	9	20	56	71	48	18/22	Second Qualifying round	First round	
1998-99	6	Isthmian League Premier Division	42	17	10	15	63	53	61	8/22	First round	Third round	
1997-98	6	Isthmian League Premier Division	42	17	11	14	56	60	62	8/22	Second round	First round	
1996-97	7	Isthmian League Division One	42	22	13	7	81	38	79	2/22	First qualifying round	Third qualifying round	Promoted
1995-96	7	Isthmian League Division One	42	16	13	13	70	60	61	9/22	Second qualifying round	Second qualifying round	
1994-95	7	Isthmian League Division One	42	17	10	15	81	71	61	7/22	First qualifying round	Second qualifying round	
1993-94	6	Isthmian League Premier Division	42	5	12	25	38	86	27	21/22	Third qualifying round	First qualifying round	Relegated
1992-93	6	Isthmian League Premier Division	42	12	17	13	49	45	53	12/22	First qualifying round	First round	
1991-92	6	Isthmian League Premier Division	42	14	11	17	56	65	53	14/22	Second qualifying round	First qualifying round	
1990-91	6	Isthmian League Premier Division	42	12	7	23	57	95	43	18/22	Fourth qualifying round	First qualifying round	
1989-90	6	Isthmian League Premier Division	42	18	9	15	65	55	63	8/22	Second round	First qualifying round	
1988-89	7	Isthmian League Division One	40	25	8	7	85	36	83	2/21	Second qualifying round	First round	Promoted
1987-88	6	Isthmian League Premier Division	42	6	17	19	37	71	35	22/22	Fourth qualifying round	Second qualifying round	Relegated
1986-87	6	Southern League Premier Division	42	12	12	18	53	78	48	16/22	First qualifying round	Third qualifying round	
1985-86	6	Southern League Premier Division	38	13	4	21	36	67	43	15/20	Second qualifying round	Second qualifying round	
1984-85	7	Southern League Southern Division	38	24	9	5	61	22	81	1/20	First qualifying round	Third qualifying round	Promoted
1983-84	7	Southern League Southern Division	38	20	9	9	54	36	69	3/20	Fourth qualifying round	Second qualifying round	
1982-83	7	Southern League Southern Division	34	8	10	16	37	56	34	15/18	Second qualifying round	First qualifying round	
1981-82	6	Southern League Southern Division	46	18	12	16	74	61	48	12/24	Third qualifying round	Second qualifying round	Relegated
1980-81	6	Southern League Southern Division	46	16	14	16	69	58	46	14/24	First qualifying round	Third qualifying round	
1979-80	6	Southern League Southern Division	46	9	15	22	48	79	33	22/24	Preliminary round	Second qualifying round	
1978-79	6	Southern League Division One South	40	12	11	17	49	62	35	16/21	Second qualifying round	First qualifying round	
1977-78	6	Southern League Division One South	38	11	11	16	44	50	33	13/20	Second qualifying round	First qualifying round	
1976-77	6	Southern League Division One South	34	12	10	12	51	43	34	11/19	Third qualifying round	Third qualifying round	
1975-76	6	Southern League Division One South	38	13	12	13	69	71	38	9/20	Third qualifying round	Third qualifying round	
1974-75	6	Southern League Division One South	38	16	11	11	64	50	43	8/20	Second qualifying round	First qualifying round	
1973-74	6	Southern League Division One South	38	14	11	13	55	44	39	9/20	Third qualifying round	First qualifying round	
1972-73	6	Southern League Division One South	42	14	12	16	48	57	40	13/22	Third qualifying round	First qualifying round	
1971-72	6	Southern League Division One South	30	14	4	12	37	36	32	8/16	First round	First qualifying round	
1970-71	-	Hampshire League Division One	30	27	3	0	95	14	57	1/16	Third qualifying round	First qualifying round	Joined Southern Football League
1969-70	-	Hampshire League Division One	30	24	2	4	77	21	50	1/16	First qualifying round	Third qualifying round	
1968-69	-	Hampshire League Division One	30	20	4	6	89	42	44	2/16	First qualifying round	-	
1967-68	-	Hampshire League Division One	30	18	8	4	72	40	44	1/16	Seond qualifying round	-	
1966-67	-	Hampshire League Division One	30	17	8	5	86	40	42	2/16	First qualifying round	-	
1965-66	-	Hampshire League Division One	30	19	5	6	75	39	43	2/16	Second qualifying round	-	
1964-65	-	Hampshire League Division One	30	11	5	14	61	73	27	10/16	Third qualifying round	-	
1963-64	-	Hampshire League Division One	30	8	7	15	63	73	23	13/16	Third qualifying round-	-	
1962-63	-	Hampshire League Division One	30	11	5	14	58	67	27	9/16	Second qualifying round	-	
1961-62	-	Hampshire League Division One	30	12	5	13	71	62	29	9/16	Second qualifying round	-	
1960-61	-	Hampshire League Division One	30	11	5	14	68	61	27	8/16	-	-	
1959-60	-	Hampshire League Division One	26	15	6	5	66	44	36	3/14	Fourth qualifying round	-	
1958-59	-	Hampshire League Division One	26	11	1	14	55	63	23	8/14	First qualifying round	-	
1957-58	-	Hampshire League Division One	26	9	5	12	55	55	23	8/14	Second qualifying round	-	
1956-57	-	Hampshire League Division One	26	9	6	11	40	58	24	8/14	-	-	
1955-56	-	Hampshire League Division One	26	9	5	12	32	32	23	10/14	First qualifying round	-	
1954-55	-	Hampshire League Division One	26	10	2	14	49	63	22	10/14	Second qualifying round	-	
1953-54	-	Hampshire League Division One	26	9	7	10	57	51	25	8/14	First qualifying round	-	
1952-53	-	Hampshire League Division One	26	9	3	14	44	63	21	9/14	Third qualifying round	-	
1951-52	-	Hampshire League Division One	26	7	5	14	43	73	19	11/14	Second qualifying round	-	
1950-51	-	Hampshire League Division One	26	14	1	11	57	46	29	6/14	Extra preliminary round	-	
1949-50	-	Hampshire League Division One	26	10	2	14	51	67	22	10/14	Extra preliminary round	-	
1948-49	-	Hampshire League Division One	26	9	5	12	66	74	23	11/14	Extra preliminary round	-	
1947-48	-	-		-	-	-	-	-	-	-	Preliminary round	-	
1946-47	-	-		-	-	-	-	-	-	-	Preliminary round	-	
Competitive football suspended during World War II.
1938-39	-	Hampshire League Division One	30	4	6	20	39	99	14	15/16	-	-	
1937-38	-	Hampshire League Division One	30	7	7	16	54	91	21	13/16	-	-	
1936-37	-	Hampshire League Division One	30	13	8	9	79	65	34	6/16	-	-	
1935-36	-	Hampshire League Division One	30	12	6	12	60	65	30	10/16	-	-	
1934-35	-	Hampshire League Division One	30	16	4	10	84	54	36	3/16	-	-	
1933-34	-	Hampshire League Division One	30	6	6	18	54	86	18	15/16	-	-	
1932-33	-	Hampshire League Division One	28	6	5	17	58	89	17	14/15	-	-	
1931-32	-	Hampshire League Division One	30	11	4	15	65	84	26	11/16	-	-	
1930-31	-	Hampshire League Division One	30	8	4	18	57	94	20	14/16	-	-	
1929-30	-	Hampshire League Division One	30	7	2	21	47	94	16	16/16	-	-	
1928-29	-	Hampshire League North Section	18	10	2	6	48	34	22	3/10	-	-	
1927-28	-	Hampshire League County Section	30	14	0	16	78	69	28	9/16	-	-	
1926-27	-	Hampshire League County Section	30	8	2	20	68	105	18	15/16	-	-	
1925-26	-	Hampshire League County Section	30	9	3	18	66	82	21	14/16	-	-	
1924-25	-	Hampshire League County Section	30	7	5	18	46	82	19	15/16	-	-	
1923-24	-	Hampshire League County Section	28	6	4	18	44	78	16	15/15	-	-	
1922-23	-	Hampshire League County Section	32	10	4	18	42	60	24	14/17	-	-	
1921-22	-	Hampshire League County Section	28	8	3	17	32	66	19	14/15	-	-	
1920-21	-	Hampshire League County Section	22	6	6	10	28	54	18	7/12	-	-	
1919-20	-	Hampshire League County Section	12	2	4	6	8	22	8	5/7	-	-	
Competitive football suspended during World War I.
1913-14	-	Hampshire League North Section	10	3	3	4	22	21	9	4/6	-	-	
1912-13	-	Hampshire League County Section	14	3	2	9	20	41	8	8/8	-	-	
1911-12	-	Hampshire League North Section	10	10	0	0	40	9	20	1/6	-	-	
1910-11	-	Hampshire League North Section	12	3	3	6	22	44	9	5/7	-	-	
1909-10	-	Hampshire League North Section	10	2	0	8	12	42	4	5/6	-	-	
1908-09	-	Hampshire League North Section	10	1	3	6	8	28	5	5/6	-	-	
1907-08	-	Hampshire League North Section	12	1	0	11	5	41	2	7/7	-	-	
1906-07	-	Hampshire League North Section	12	2	1	9	20	58	5	7/7	-	-	
1905-06	-	Hampshire League North Section	9	5	0	4	26	13	10	3/6	-	-	
1904-05	-	Hampshire League North Section	10	2	0	8	14	34	4	6/6	-	-	
1903-04	-	Hampshire League North Section	14	2	2	10	12	39	6	8/8	-	-	
1902-03	-	Hampshire League	14	4	1	9	18	49	9	6/8	-	-	
1901-02	-	Hampshire League	10	4	1	5	24	34	9	4/6	-	-	

== See also ==
- Basingstoke Town F.C. players
- Basingstoke Town F.C. managers
