= 1982–83 Southern Football League =

Season of the Southern Football League

The 1982–83 Southern Football League season was the 80th in the history of the league, an English football competition.

This season saw the reintroduction of the Premier Division. AP Leamington won the Premier Division, winning their first Southern League title, whilst Kidderminster Harriers was promoted to the Alliance Premier League. Cheltenham Town, Folkestone, Sutton Coldfield Town, Fisher Athletic were all promoted to the Premier Division, the last two for the first time in their history.

== Premier Division ==
The Premier Division was reformed and consisted of the best clubs from the Midland and the Southern divisions. It also featured three new clubs, relegated from the Alliance Premier League:

- AP Leamington
- Dartford
- Gravesend & Northfleet

At the end of the season Enderby Town changed name to Leicester United.

=== League table ===
Southern Football League Premier Division
- Season: 1982–83
- Champions: AP Leamington
- Promoted: Kidderminster Harriers
- Relegated: Addlestone & Weybridge Town; Enderby Town; Poole Town; Waterlooville
- Matches: 380
- Goals: 1,105 (2.91 per match)

Pos	Team	Pld	W	D	L	GF	GA	GD	Pts	Promotion or relegation
1	AP Leamington	38	25	4	9	78	50	+28	79	
2	Kidderminster Harriers	38	23	7	8	69	40	+29	76	Promoted to the Alliance Premier League
3	Welling United	38	21	6	11	63	40	+23	69	
4	Chelmsford City	38	16	11	11	57	40	+17	59	
5	Bedworth United	38	16	11	11	47	39	+8	59	
6	Dartford	38	16	8	14	48	38	+10	56	
7	Gosport Borough	38	14	13	11	47	43	+4	55	
8	Fareham Town	38	16	7	15	73	82	−9	55	
9	Dorchester Town	38	14	12	12	52	50	+2	54	
10	Gravesend & Northfleet	38	14	12	12	49	50	−1	54	
11	Gloucester City	38	13	12	13	61	57	+4	51	
12	Witney Town	38	12	13	13	60	48	+12	47 (Note: Witney Town were deducted two points.)	
13	Alvechurch	38	13	8	17	60	66	−6	47	
14	Stourbridge	38	12	11	15	48	54	−6	47	
15	Corby Town	38	12	11	15	58	67	−9	47	
16	Hastings United	38	11	11	16	48	61	−13	44	
17	Enderby Town	38	11	9	18	44	62	−18	42	Relegated to the Midland Division
18	Waterlooville	38	10	9	19	62	83	−21	39	Relegated to the Southern Division
19	Poole Town	38	9	9	20	57	73	−16	36	Relegated to the Southern Division
20	Addlestone & Weybridge Town	38	5	10	23	24	62	−38	25	Relegated to the Southern Division

Source: fchd.com rsssf.com
Rules for classification: 1) points; 2) goal difference; 3) number of goals scored.

== Midland Division ==
After the Premier Division reintroduction at the end of the previous season, the Midland Division consisted of 17 clubs, including 11 clubs from the previous season Midland Division and six new clubs:

- Three clubs joined from the West Midlands (Regional) League
  - Dudley Town
  - Sutton Coldfield Town
  - Willenhall Town
- Plus:
  - Bridgwater Town, joined from the Western Football League
  - Oldbury United, joined from the Midland Football Combination
  - Forest Green Rovers, joined from the Hellenic Football League

=== League table ===
Southern Football League Midland Division
- Season: 1982–83
- Champions: Cheltenham Town
- Promoted: Cheltenham Town; Sutton Coldfield Town
- Matches: 272
- Goals: 832 (3.06 per match)

Pos	Team	Pld	W	D	L	GF	GA	GD	Pts	Promotion or relegation
1	Cheltenham Town	32	22	5	5	65	29	+36	71	Promoted to the Premier Division
2	Sutton Coldfield Town	32	21	7	4	62	24	+38	70	Promoted to the Premier Division
3	Forest Green Rovers	32	21	3	8	68	32	+36	66	
4	Merthyr Tydfil	32	17	7	8	64	45	+19	58	
5	Willenhall Town	32	17	6	9	74	49	+25	57	
6	Oldbury United	32	16	6	10	52	49	+3	54	
7	Banbury United	32	15	3	14	59	55	+4	48	
8	Bridgend Town	32	12	11	9	46	37	+9	47	Transferred to the Welsh Football League
9	Wellingborough Town	32	13	7	12	49	37	+12	46	
10	Bromsgrove Rovers	32	13	5	14	47	47	0	44	
11	Dudley Town	32	12	7	13	40	45	−5	43	
12	Bridgwater Town	32	12	6	14	42	43	−1	42	
13	Aylesbury United	32	12	5	15	37	51	−14	41	
14	Redditch United	32	8	6	18	51	73	−22	30	
15	Taunton Town	32	5	7	20	30	64	−34	22	Resigned to the Western Football League
16	Minehead	32	5	7	20	24	62	−38	22	Resigned to the Western Football League
17	Milton Keynes City	32	0	4	28	22	90	−68	4	

Source: fchd.com rsssf.com
Rules for classification: 1) points; 2) goal difference; 3) number of goals scored.

== Southern Division ==
After the Premier Division reintroduction at the end of the previous season, the Southern Division consisted of 18 clubs, including 14 clubs from the previous season Southern Division and four new clubs:

- Erith & Belvedere, joined from the Kent Football League
- Fisher Athletic, joined from the London Spartan League
- Road-Sea Southampton, joined from the City of Southampton Sunday League
- Woodford Town, joined from the Athenian League

=== League table ===
Southern Football League Southern Division
- Season: 1982–83
- Champions: Fisher Athletic
- Promoted: Fisher Athletic; Folkestone
- Matches: 306
- Goals: 878 (2.87 per match)

Pos	Team	Pld	W	D	L	GF	GA	GD	Pts	Promotion or relegation
1	Fisher Athletic	34	23	5	6	79	34	+45	74	Promoted to the Premier Division
2	Folkestone	34	22	6	6	79	41	+38	72	Promoted to the Premier Division
3	Road-Sea Southampton	34	21	7	6	66	30	+36	70	
4	Dunstable	34	19	5	10	57	39	+18	62	
5	Hillingdon Borough	34	14	11	9	41	30	+11	53	
6	Salisbury	34	14	10	10	58	49	+9	52	
7	Crawley Town	34	14	9	11	51	43	+8	51	
8	Ashford Town (Kent)	34	13	10	11	51	41	+10	49	
9	Tonbridge	34	14	5	15	57	57	0	47	
10	Hounslow	34	11	12	11	46	47	−1	45	
11	Canterbury City	34	12	9	13	52	63	−11	45	
12	Cambridge City	34	12	5	17	56	63	−7	41	
13	Dover	34	11	7	16	35	52	−17	40	Club folded
14	Thanet United	34	10	5	19	30	61	−31	35	
15	Basingstoke Town	34	8	10	16	37	56	−19	34	
16	Woodford Town	34	6	9	19	29	57	−28	27	
17	Andover	34	6	8	20	28	53	−25	26	
18	Erith & Belvedere	34	5	9	20	26	62	−36	24	

Source: fchd.com rsssf.com
Rules for classification: 1) points; 2) goal difference; 3) number of goals scored.

== See also ==
- Southern Football League
- 1982–83 Isthmian League
- 1982–83 Northern Premier League
