= 1885 in association football =

The following are the association football events of the year 1885 throughout the world.

== Events ==
During the summer of 1885, there was pressure put on the Football Association to accept professionalism in English football, culminating in a special meeting on 20 July, after which it was announced that it was "in the interests of Association Football, to legalise the employment of professional football players, but only under certain restrictions". Clubs were allowed to pay players provided that they had either been born or had lived for two years within a six-mile radius of the ground. There were also rules preventing professional players playing for more than one club in a season, without obtaining special permission, and all professional players had to be registered with the F.A.

- 12 September: Arbroath F.C. beat Bon Accord F.C. (of Aberdeen) 36-0, a record which stands to this day. On the same day, Dundee Harp beat Aberdeen Rovers 35–0.

=== Denmark ===
- Aalborg BK

=== England ===
- Bromsgrove Rovers F.C.
- Bury F.C.
- Chester City F.C.
- Hailsham Town F.C.
- Kingstonian F.C.
- Lewes F.C.
- Luton Town F.C.
- Millwall Rovers F.C.
- Southampton F.C.

=== Scotland ===
- Dunfermline Athletic F.C.
- St Johnstone F.C.

== Domestic cups ==
Nation	Tournament	Winner	Score	Runner-up	Venue	Title	Previous title won
England	1884–85 FA Cup	Blackburn Rovers	2-0	(Scotland) Queen's Park	Kennington Oval	2nd	1884
Ireland	1884–85 Irish Cup	Distillery	3-0	Limavady	Ulster Cricket Ground	2nd	1884
Scotland	1884–85 Scottish Cup	Renton	3-1 (replay following 0-0 draw)	Vale of Leven	Cathkin Park	1st	None
Wales	1884–85 Welsh Cup	Druids	3-1	Oswestry White Stars	Racecourse Ground	4th	1882

== International tournaments ==
- 1884–85 British Home Championship (28 February – 11 April 1885)

Pos	Team	Pld	W	D	L	GF	GA	GD	Pts
1	Scotland (C)	3	2	1	0	17	4	+13	5
2	England	3	1	2	0	6	2	+4	4
3	Wales	3	1	1	1	10	11	−1	3
4	Ireland	3	0	0	3	4	20	−16	0

Rules for classification: 1) Points. The points system worked as follows: 2 points for a win and 1 point for a draw.
(C) Champions

== Births ==
- 20 February – George Wall (d. 1962), England international forward in seven matches (1907–1913), scoring two goals.
- 21 April – Harry Hampton (d. 1963), England international forward in four matches (1913–1914), scoring two goals.
- 15 May – Jimmy Brownlie (d. 1973), Scotland international goalkeeper in sixteen matches (1909–1914).
- 9 July – Caius Welcker (d. 1939), Netherlands international forward in fifteen matches (c. 1908), scoring five goals.
- 10 August – George Hilsdon (d. 1941), England international forward in eight matches (1907–1909), scoring fourteen goals.
- 21 August – William Beadling (d. 1944), English professional footballer
- 10 September – Albert Shepherd (d. 1929), England international forward in two matches (1906–1911), scoring two goals.
- 1 October – Bert Freeman (d. 1955), England international forward in five matches (1909–1912), scoring three goals.
- 20 November – George Holley (d. 1942), England international forward in ten matches (1909–1913), scoring eight goals.
- 21 November – Robert Evans (d. 1965), international forward for both Wales (ten matches; 1906–1910) and England (four matches; 1911–1912).
