= Beadling =

Beadling may refer to:

- Pittsburgh Beadling, American football team
- Tom Beadling (born 1996), Australian footballer
- William Beadling (1885–1944), English footballer
