= 1980–81 Southern Football League =

The 1980–81 Southern Football League season was the 78th in the history of the league, an English football competition.

Alvechurch won the Midland Division, whilst Dartford won the Southern Division. Alvechurch were declared Southern League champions after defeating Dartford 4–3 on penalties, after the two championship play-offs had finished 3–3 on aggregate (Alvechurch won 1–0 at home and Dartford won 3–2). Despite Alvechurch being champions, they declined promotion to the Alliance Premier League alongside Dartford as their board thought they were not ready, with third-placed Trowbridge Town going up in their place. There was no relegation for the second successive season, although Bognor Regis Town transferred to the Isthmian League at the end of the season.

Bedford Town, who finished second to Alvechurch in the Midland Division on goal difference, won the Southern League Cup.

== Midland Division ==
The Midland Division consisted of 22 clubs, including 21 clubs from the previous season and one new club:

- Redditch United, relegated from the Alliance Premier League

Bedford Town needed to beat Enderby Town by eight goals in their last game of the season to win the league but only won 2-0 making Alvechurch the champions.

Dave Lewis of Gloucester City was top scorer for the season with 27 goals.

=== League table ===
Southern Football League Midland Division
- Season: 1980–81
- Champions: Alvechurch
- Promoted: Trowbridge Town
- Matches: 462
- Goals: 1,318 (2.85 per match)

Pos	Team	Pld	W	D	L	GF	GA	GD	Pts	Promotion or relegation
1	Alvechurch	42	26	9	7	76	40	+36	61	
2	Bedford Town	42	25	11	6	63	32	+31	61	
3	Trowbridge Town	42	24	9	9	69	39	+30	57	Promoted to the Alliance Premier League
4	Kidderminster Harriers	42	23	9	10	67	41	+26	55	
5	Barry Town	42	21	9	12	60	40	+20	51	
6	Stourbridge	42	17	16	9	75	49	+26	50	
7	Enderby Town	42	21	8	13	71	47	+24	50	
8	Cheltenham Town	42	18	12	12	70	59	+11	48	
9	Bromsgrove Rovers	42	19	9	14	65	50	+15	47	
10	Corby Town	42	19	7	16	69	58	+11	45	
11	Bridgend Town	42	19	7	16	74	64	+10	45	
12	Minehead	42	19	7	16	54	60	−6	45	
13	Gloucester City	42	19	6	17	82	72	+10	44	
14	Merthyr Tydfil	42	15	12	15	60	50	+10	42	
15	Bedworth United	42	14	12	16	49	46	+3	40	
16	Banbury United	42	11	11	20	51	65	−14	33	
17	Taunton Town	42	10	9	23	48	68	−20	29	
18	Cambridge City	42	8	12	22	46	87	−41	28	
19	Witney Town	42	9	9	24	44	65	−21	27	
20	Wellingborough Town	42	10	7	25	43	91	−48	27	
21	Redditch United	42	11	4	27	54	92	−38	26	
22	Milton Keynes City	42	3	7	32	28	103	−75	13	

Source: fchd.com rsssf.com
Rules for classification: 1) points; 2) goal difference; 3) number of goals scored.

== Southern Division ==
There were no new clubs in the Southern Division this season. Though, at the end of the previous season Addlestone was renamed Addlestone & Weybridge Town and Folkestone & Shepway was renamed Folkestone.

At the end of the season Margate was renamed Thanet United.

=== League table ===
Southern Football League Southern Division
- Season: 1980–81
- Champions: Dartford
- Promoted: Dartford
- Matches: 552
- Goals: 1,520 (2.75 per match)

Pos	Team	Pld	W	D	L	GF	GA	GD	Pts	Promotion or relegation
1	Dartford	46	26	14	6	76	39	+37	66	Promoted to the Alliance Premier League
2	Bognor Regis Town	46	25	13	8	95	43	+52	63	Transferred to the Isthmian League Division One
3	Hastings United	46	24	14	8	87	43	+44	62	
4	Gosport Borough	46	24	12	10	84	52	+32	60	
5	Waterlooville	46	19	21	6	67	50	+17	59	
6	Dorchester Town	46	21	13	12	84	56	+28	55	
7	Dover	46	22	10	14	70	50	+20	54	
8	Poole Town	46	19	14	13	70	56	+14	52	
9	Addlestone & Weybridge Town	46	21	9	16	66	57	+9	51	
10	Dunstable	46	19	13	14	73	68	+5	51	
11	Aylesbury United	46	20	10	16	66	60	+6	50	
12	Hounslow	46	17	13	16	65	55	+10	47	
13	Hillingdon Borough	46	16	15	15	50	49	+1	47	
14	Basingstoke Town	46	16	14	16	69	58	+11	46	
15	Crawley Town	46	18	4	24	64	78	−14	40	
16	Ashford Town (Kent)	46	12	15	19	55	76	−21	39	
17	Tonbridge Angels	46	12	15	19	44	68	−24	39	
18	Chelmsford City	46	13	12	21	54	78	−24	38	
19	Canterbury City	46	12	13	21	40	59	−19	37	
20	Salisbury	46	14	8	24	57	76	−19	36	
21	Folkestone	46	11	11	24	47	65	−18	33	
22	Margate	46	11	7	28	65	117	−52	29	
23	Fareham Town	46	5	18	23	31	73	−42	28	
24	Andover	46	6	10	30	41	94	−53	22	

Source: fchd.com rsssf.com
Rules for classification: 1) points; 2) goal difference; 3) number of goals scored.

== See also ==
- Southern Football League
- 1980–81 Isthmian League
- 1980–81 Northern Premier League
