= Rafi Razzak =

British businessman

Rafi Razzak (born March 28, 1949) is founder and owner of Centerprise International (CI), a provider of managed IT and system integration services to corporate, government and education customers in the UK. CI claims to be the longest standing Ministry of Defence approved IT supplier in the UK, since 1992.

== Career ==
Razzak is the son of Arif Abd ar-Razzaq, who was Prime Minister of Iraq in 1965. He studied electronics engineering at Imperial College London and started CI in 1983, after 9 years as an engineer at IBM and holding the position of vice president at PAC International. He won CBI Entrepreneur of the Year in 2000. In 2013, Rafi invested in the UK marketplace OnBuy, in partnership with entrepreneur and founder of OnBuy.com, Cas Paton. However, the launch was cancelled and OnBuy re-launched in 2016 without Centerprise.

He is also a former Chairman of Basingstoke Town Football Club., and won Basingstoke Businessman of the Year in 2009 and the Basingstoke Ambassador Award in 2012.

== Philanthropic work ==
Razzak helped fundraise for a cancer treatment centre for Hampshire and West Berks and has sponsored the Business and the Community Award at the Inspire 2012 Business Awards.
