= Staplewood Campus =

Football training centre

Staplewood Training Ground
- Interactive map of Staplewood Training Ground
- Former names: Staplewood Training Ground, Road-Sea Park
- Address: Long Lane, Marchwood, Hampshire, SO40 4WR
- Coordinates: 50°53′19″N 1°27′43″W
- Owner: Southampton F.C.
- Capacity: 3,000
- Type: Football Training Complex

Construction
- Opened: Mid-1980s

Staplewood Campus in Marchwood, Hampshire is the training ground of Southampton Football Club. It was the home ground of Road-Sea Southampton until 1987 before being purchased by Southampton. The training campus houses the men's and women's first team alongside the academy sides.

== History ==
The site was originally named Road-Sea Park and was the home ground of defunct semi-professional football club Road-Sea Southampton. Following Road-Sea Southampton's resignation from the league and folding, the ground was sold to Southampton who began to use it for training purposes as well as hosting their reserve and youth matches.

== Redevelopment ==
In October 2013, a plan to build five pitches and an 11-metre high training dome, a 108-space car park and floodlights at the pitches next to the A326 was approved. The plans were objected by three letters from two parties, but the New Forest District Council's planning committee concluded it would have "no significant adverse impact upon the character and appearance of the area, adjoining amenity, nature conservation interests or highway safety".

Southampton officially opened up their new training centre in November 2014, naming the main building after the late owner Markus Liebherr.

In March 2017, Chief Executive Gareth Rogers stated that the redevelopment of the training ground would not exceed the £40 million mark.

In January 2022, Southampton were permitted to build a new gym for first-team players, with the club stating it needed a bigger gym similar to other gyms being used by Premier League rivals. In December 2022, civic chiefs approved an application to demolish an "unsafe" building which had been vacant for more than two years to provide extra parking spaces for staff and players associated with the academy management building.

== Facilities ==
The training centre provides training pitches and support facilities for Southampton’s academy, located in the Academy Village with the first team. The sports science, scouting & recruitment, football administration and medical departments are located in the Markus Liebherr Pavilion.

The Markus Liebherr Pavilion is a two-storey building with an L-shaped plan. The ground floor of the building consists of a meeting room, auditorium, changing rooms for players and staff, hydrotherapy area with a swimming pool, first team gym with mezzanine and a laundry room whilst the first floor consists of office areas for staff, coaches and directors with meeting rooms and anciallary facilities and a dedicated dining area for the first team, the academy and staff.
