= 1984–85 West Midlands (Regional) League =

The 1984–85 West Midlands (Regional) League season was the 85th in the history of the West Midlands (Regional) League, an English association football competition for semi-professional and amateur teams based in the West Midlands county, Shropshire, Herefordshire, Worcestershire and southern Staffordshire.

== Premier Division ==
West Midlands League Premier Division
- Season: 1984–85
- Champions: Halesowen Town
- Promoted: Bilston Town
- Matches: 380
- Goals: 1,125 (2.96 per match)

The Premier Division featured 18 clubs which competed in the division last season, along with two new clubs:

- Tamworth, relegated from the Southern League
- Tipton Town, promoted from Division One

=== League table ===
Pos	Team	Pld	W	D	L	GF	GA	GD	Pts	Promotion or relegation
1	Halesowen Town	38	28	6	4	96	36	+60	62	
2	Bilston Town	38	24	5	9	84	49	+35	53	Promoted to the Southern League
3	Atherstone United	38	20	8	10	64	40	+24	48	
4	Wednesfield Social	38	20	8	10	52	34	+18	48	
5	Tipton Town	38	19	10	9	67	52	+15	48	
6	Tividale	38	19	9	10	53	39	+14	47	
7	Tamworth	38	16	14	8	66	38	+28	46	
8	Gresley Rovers	38	16	8	14	62	56	+6	40	
9	Hinckley Athletic	38	14	10	14	63	59	+4	38	
10	Oldswinford	38	14	7	17	61	61	0	35	
11	GKN Sankeys	38	11	13	14	47	50	−3	35	
12	Lye Town	38	11	12	15	47	47	0	34	
13	Rushall Olympic	38	12	10	16	57	58	−1	34	
14	Brereton Social	38	12	10	16	58	83	−25	34	
15	Wolverhampton United	38	10	11	17	39	49	−10	31	
16	Chasetown	38	10	11	17	45	65	−20	31	
17	Malvern Town	38	9	12	17	49	57	−8	30	
18	Blakenall	38	7	10	21	40	69	−29	24	
19	Armitage	38	8	7	23	45	95	−50	23	
20	Shifnal Town	38	5	9	24	30	88	−58	19	

Source: nonleaguematters
Rules for classification: 1) points; 2) goal difference; 3) number of goals scored.
