= 1982–83 West Midlands (Regional) League =

The 1982–83 West Midlands (Regional) League season was the 83rd in the history of the West Midlands (Regional) League, an English association football competition for semi-professional and amateur teams based in the West Midlands county, Shropshire, Herefordshire, Worcestershire and southern Staffordshire.

== Premier Division ==
West Midlands League Premier Division
- Season: 1982–83
- Champions: Halesowen Town
- Matches: 380
- Goals: 1,196 (3.15 per match)

The Premier Division featured 18 clubs which competed in the division last season, along with two clubs, promoted from Division One:

- Atherstone United
- Wolverhampton United

=== League table ===
Pos	Team	Pld	W	D	L	GF	GA	GD	Pts	Promotion or relegation
1	Halesowen Town	38	28	6	4	124	37	+87	62	
2	Hinckley Athletic	38	24	7	7	59	32	+27	55	
3	Hednesford Town	38	22	4	12	64	53	+11	48	
4	Shifnal Town	38	19	9	10	78	48	+30	47	
5	Atherstone United	38	21	5	12	73	46	+27	47	
6	Bilston	38	19	7	12	82	50	+32	45	
7	VS Rugby	38	17	10	11	69	36	+33	44	Joined the Southern League
8	Armitage	38	18	8	12	61	51	+10	44	
9	Gresley Rovers	38	15	11	12	69	52	+17	41	
10	Tividale	38	18	5	15	52	48	+4	41	
11	Wednesfield Social	38	17	7	14	47	47	0	41	
12	Wolverhampton United	38	14	12	12	50	47	+3	40	
13	Lye Town	38	13	10	15	50	49	+1	36	
14	Rushall Olympic	38	12	8	18	59	66	−7	32	
15	Blakenall	38	8	13	17	45	61	−16	29	
16	Coventry Sporting	38	7	14	17	40	64	−24	28	Joined the Southern League
17	Oldswinford	38	6	11	21	46	78	−32	23	
18	Brereton Social	38	8	6	24	43	89	−46	22	
19	Ledbury Town	38	6	7	25	45	117	−72	19	Resigned from the league
20	Malvern Town	38	6	4	28	40	125	−85	16	

Source: nonleaguematters
Rules for classification: 1) points; 2) goal difference; 3) number of goals scored.
