= 1981–82 Athenian League =

Athenian League
- Season: 1981–82
- Champions: Leyton-Wingate
- Promoted: Leyton-Wingate; Uxbridge
- Relegated: None

The 1981–82 Athenian League season was the 59th in the history of Athenian League. The league consisted of 19 teams.

== Clubs ==
The league joined 3 new teams:

- Kingsbury Town, from London Spartan League Premier Division
- Whyteleafe, from London Spartan League Premier Division
- Horley Town, from London Spartan League Premier Division

== League table ==
Pos	Team	Pld	W	D	L	GF	GA	GR	Pts	Promotion or relegation
1	Leyton-Wingate (C, P)	36	28	8	0	87	19	4.579	64	Promotion to Isthmian League Division Two
2	Edgware	36	20	10	6	76	52	1.462	50	
3	Uxbridge (P)	36	20	9	7	56	27	2.074	49	Promotion to Isthmian League Division Two
4	Burnham	36	19	7	10	64	44	1.455	45	
5	Redhill	36	14	13	9	43	38	1.132	41	
6	Harefield United	36	14	12	10	52	47	1.106	40	
7	Ruislip Manor	36	15	9	12	58	55	1.055	39	
8	Banstead Athletic	36	13	12	11	51	39	1.308	38	
9	Chertsey Town	36	11	14	11	43	44	0.977	36	
10	Woodford Town	36	13	8	15	48	45	1.067	34	Transferred to Southern League Southern Division
11	Marlow	36	12	8	16	40	46	0.870	32	
12	Kingsbury Town	36	11	10	15	43	52	0.827	32	
13	Whyteleafe	36	8	15	13	30	41	0.732	31	
14	Horley Town	36	10	10	16	40	45	0.889	30	
15	Hoddesdon Town	36	11	7	18	50	57	0.877	29	
16	Grays Athletic	36	10	8	18	41	62	0.661	28	
17	Chalfont St.Peter	36	8	10	18	42	50	0.840	26	
18	Fleet Town	36	7	9	20	38	76	0.500	23	
19	Haringey Borough	36	4	9	23	27	90	0.300	17	

Source: fchd.info
Rules for classification: 1) points; 2) goal difference; 3) number of goals scored.
(C) Champions; (P) Promoted

=== Stadia and locations ===
Locations of the Athenian League clubs
Greater London Athenian League football clubs

Club	Stadium
Banstead Athletic	Merland Rise
Burnham	The 1878 Stadium
Chalfont St Peter	Mill Meadow
Chertsey Town	Alwyns Lane
Edgware	White Lion
Fleet Town	Calthorpe Park
Grays Athletic	New Recreation Ground
Harefield United	Preston Park
Haringey Borough	Coles Park
Hoddesdon Town	Lowfield
Horley Town	The New Defence
Kingsbury Town	Avenue Park
Leyton-Wingate	Wadham Lodge
Redhill	Kiln Brow
Ruislip Manor	Grosvenor Vale
Marlow	Alfred Davis Memorial Ground
Uxbridge	Honeycroft
Whyteleafe	Church Road
Woodford Town	Snakes Lane
