= Enderby Town Football Club Ltd v The Football Association Ltd =

English case law, Chancery Division

Enderby Town FC Ltd v Football Association Ltd
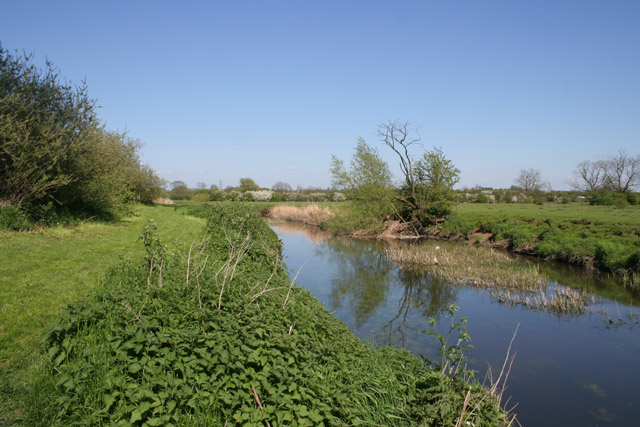
- Enderby, River Soar
- Court: Court of Appeal
- Full case name: Enderby Town Football Club Ltd v The Football Association Ltd
- Citation: [1971] Ch 591

Keywords
- Contract, illegality, public policy

Enderby Town Football Club Ltd v The Football Association Ltd [1971] Ch 591 is an English contract law case, concerning the scope of contracts and association rules that can be contrary to public policy and illegal.

== Facts ==
The Football Association Ltd controlled association football, while county associations were affiliated to it. Enderby Town FC were fined by the county association, and they appealed to the FA. They claimed they should be represented by a solicitor and counsel, but the FA rejected this under rule 38(b) of their association. Enderby claimed that the rule 38 was contrary to natural justice.

== Judgment ==
The Court of Appeal held that rule 38(b) was not invalid. However, it was noted that rule 40(b) which purported to prevent legal proceedings without the consent of the council was contrary to public policy and invalid.

Lord Denning MR said the following.

Has the court any power to go behind the wording of the rule and consider its validity? On this point Sir Elwyn Jones made an important concession. He agreed that if the rule was contrary to natural justice, it would be invalid. I think this concession was rightly made and I desire to emphasise it. The rules of a body like this are often said to be a contract. So they are in legal theory. But it is a fiction - a fiction created by the lawyers so as to give the courts jurisdiction. This is no new thing. There are many precedents for it from the time of John Doe onwards. Putting the fiction aside, the truth is that the rules are nothing more nor less than a legislative code - a set of regulations laid down by the governing body to be observed by all who are, or become, members of the association. Such regulations, though said to be a contract, are subject to the control of the courts. If they are in unreasonable restraint of trade, they are invalid: see Dickson v Pharmaceutical Society of Great Britain [1967] Ch. 708; [1970] A.C. 403 . If they seek to oust the jurisdiction of the court, they are invalid: see Scott v Avery (1856) 5 H.L.Cas. 811 . If they unreasonably shut out a man from his right to work, they are invalid: see Nagle v Feilden [1966] 2 Q.B. 633; Edwards v. Society of Graphical and Allied Trades [1971] Ch. 354 . If they lay down a procedure which is contrary to the principles of natural justice, they are invalid: see Faramus v Film Artistes' Association [1964] A.C. 925, 947, per Lord Pearce. All these are cases where the judges have decided, avowedly or not, according to what is best for the public good. I know that over 300 years ago Hobart C.J. said the "Public policy is an unruly horse." It has often been repeated since. So unruly is the horse, it is said [per Burrough J. in Richardson v Mellish (1824) 2 Bing. 229, 252], that no judge should ever try to mount it lest it run away with him. I disagree. With a good man in the saddle, the unruly horse can be kept in control. It can jump over obstacles. It can leap the fences put up by fictions and come down on *607 the side of justice, as indeed was done in Nagle v Feilden [1966] 2 Q.B. 633 . It can hold a rule to be invalid even though it is contained in a contract.

Take an instance from this present case. The F.A. have a rule 40 (b) which says:

"The rules of the association are sufficient to enable the council as the governing authority to deal with all cases of dispute, and legal proceedings shall only be taken as a last resort, and then only with the consent of the council."

If that rule were valid, it would prevent the club from bringing any action in the courts without the consent of the council. But the rule is plainly invalid. Foster J. said that "it is against public policy to make provisions ousting the jurisdiction of the court." Lord Kilbrandon in Scotland said simply that it is "contrary to public policy": see St. Johnstone Football Club Ltd v Scottish Football Association Ltd, 1965 S.L.T. 171.

== See also ==
- English contract law
- Sports Law
