= 1979–80 Essex Senior Football League =

The 1979–80 season was the ninth in the history of Essex Senior Football League, a football competition in England.

The league featured 14 clubs which competed in the league last season, along with two new clubs:

- East Thurrock United, transferred from the London Spartan League
- Wivenhoe Town, joined from the Essex and Suffolk Border League

Basildon United were champions, winning their fourth Essex Senior League title in a row.

== League table ==
Essex Senior Football League
- Season: 1979–80
- Champions: Basildon United
- Matches: 240
- Goals: 650 (2.71 per match)

Pos	Team	Pld	W	D	L	GF	GA	GD	Pts	Promotion or relegation
1	Basildon United	30	25	3	2	65	8	+57	53	Transferred to the Athenian League
2	Wivenhoe Town	30	16	9	5	53	31	+22	41	
3	Canvey Island	30	17	5	8	57	34	+23	39	
4	Witham Town	30	16	6	8	55	34	+21	38	
5	East Ham United	30	14	9	7	44	30	+14	37	
6	Eton Manor	30	14	7	9	45	38	+7	35	
7	Sawbridgeworth Town	30	10	13	7	33	22	+11	33	
8	Brentwood	30	14	5	11	45	41	+4	33	
9	Bowers United	30	13	6	11	39	37	+2	32	
10	Heybridge Swifts	30	12	7	11	44	30	+14	31	
11	Coggeshall Town	30	9	6	15	37	43	−6	24	
12	East Thurrock United	30	9	6	15	28	39	−11	24	
13	Maldon Town	30	8	8	14	28	42	−14	24	
14	Ford United	30	6	7	17	32	53	−21	19	
15	Brightlingsea United	30	2	6	22	27	75	−48	10	
16	Stansted	30	2	3	25	18	93	−75	7	

Source: fchd
Rules for classification: 1) points; 2) goal difference; 3) number of goals scored.
