= Addlestone & Weybridge Town F.C. =

English football club

Addlestone & Weybridge Town
- Full name: Addlestone & Weybridge Town Football Club
- Founded: 1885 (as Addlestone); 1980 (Addlestone & Weybridge Town)
- Dissolved: 1985; 41 years ago
- Ground: Liberty Lane, Addlestone (demolished)
- 1984–85: Southern Football League Southern Division, 8th
Home colours

Addlestone & Weybridge Town Football Club, was an association football club based in Addlestone, England. Originally known as Addlestone Football Club, the club adopted its current name in 1980, reflecting a broader community identity.

The senior team reached quarter-finals of FA Vase twice and the first round of FA Cup once, where they came back from 0–2 down at Brentford to force a 2–2 draw. They lost the replay 2–0.

In 1985, the club ceased due to financial difficulties and the greater success of rival clubs. The club played their last match on 27 April against Waterlooville. The team used to play in all-red kit.

== History ==
Addlestone Football Club was formed in April 1885 by local football enthusiasts, Thomas Weeding and Frederick Darling. They played their games at Crockford Park. In early 1892 the club was suspended by the Surrey FA due to spectator hooliganism. In 1892–93 season the club won the Surrey Village Competition. In 1895 the club had grown large enough to enter the North West Surrey League, also granting them entry into the Surrey Senior Cup where they were outclassed 9–0 by shorter-lived Weybridge. The best finish for the club in this league was third in season 1904–05. The year 1906 saw a mass walkout of the committee and an acute financial crisis almost ending the club — it disbanded for a short period of time. It reformed for season 1908–09 and joined Division Two of the Surrey Junior League.

After the First World War the club joined the Surrey Intermediate League. In 1922 the club finished runners up to Chertsey Town and appeared in the Surrey Senior Cup final the year after. That success encouraged the club to move into the Surrey Senior League for the 1924–25 season. For the first time the club entered the FA Amateur Cup, losing to local rivals Egham Town and the FA Cup, defeating Weybridge in their first match 4–0 but losing the next 6–1 to Thornycroft Athletic. A bottom-of-the-table finish in 1931 forced the club to rejoin the Surrey Intermediate League.

Shortly after the end of World War II the club rejoined the Surrey Senior League. In the early 1950s the club was offered, freehold, an orchard in Liberty Lane, completed with the help of a loan from the FA, and remained there until the club folded in 1985. In 1954–55 the club entered the Parthenon League achieving a mid-table finish. Added travelling proved too much for many players so the club went back to the Surrey Senior League two seasons later. In 1959–60 the team finished runners-up to Chertsey Town. The season after, the club won the title, this time with one point more than Croydon Amateurs and Chertsey Town as well as winning the Surrey Charity Cup.

In 1964–65 the club joined the larger Spartan League with a respectable showing. In the next season re-election was narrowly avoided and the club lost 0–9 to Woking in the FA Cup. The club were 1969–70 runners-up to Hampton but won the league cup against them at Egham. The wide Athenian League admitted the club in 1971 and divisional promotion was won three years later. The same season saw Addlestone beat Woking in the final of the Southern Combination Cup. The club finished third in the first season in the higher division and retained the Southern Combination Cup beating Egham Town 2–1. The club reached the quarter-finals of the FA Vase for the second season in a row, a feat never to be repeated. In 1977 the club was refused entry into the enlarging Isthmian League and so joined the Southern League for season 1977–78. Seasons of mid-season poor results saw, in 1980–81, a new management team and a change of name to Addlestone & Weybridge Town FC. The first round proper of the FA Cup was reached. Despite being drawn to be at home the club decided to switch their first leg with Brentford to Griffin Park. The match ended in a 2–2 draw but they lost the replay 2–0.

The following season the club reached the fourth qualifying round and finished 9th in the league thus entering the newly formed Southern League Premier Division. They were bottom and relegated that next season but finished fifth in the Southern Division the season after. The sale of the ground led to a mid-season crisis within the club and the decision was taken to end its association with the town of Addlestone and move to pastures new. The club reached the final of the Surrey Senior Cup for the first time however lost 0–2 to Sutton United.

== Seasons ==
Season	Division	Position	Significant events	FA Cup	FA Trophy
1980–81	Southern League South Division	9/24		1R	3Q
1981–82	Southern League South Division	2/24		4Q	3Q
1982–83	Southern League Premier Division	20/20	Relegated	1Q	1Q
1983–84	Southern League South Division	5/20		3Q	1Q
1984–85	Southern League South Division	8/20	Club dissolved.	2Q	2Q

== See also ==
- Abbey Rangers F.C., Addlestone Moor (1976-date)

=== Bibliography ===
- Official match programme for the last AWTFC game – Sat 27 April 1985
