= 1980–81 Athenian League =

Athenian League
- Season: 1980–81
- Champions: Windsor & Eton
- Promoted: Windsor & Eton; Basildon United
- Relegated: None

The 1980–81 Athenian League season was the 58th in the history of Athenian League. The league consisted of 20 teams.

== Clubs ==
The league joined 1 new team:

- Basildon United, from Essex Senior League

== League table ==
Pos	Team	Pld	W	D	L	GF	GA	GR	Pts	Promotion or relegation
1	Windsor & Eton (C, P)	38	27	6	5	100	32	3.125	60	Promotion to Isthmian League Division Two
2	Basildon United (P)	38	24	11	3	71	24	2.958	59	Promotion to Isthmian League Division Two
3	Banstead Athletic	38	23	10	5	73	32	2.281	56	
4	Grays Athletic	38	23	7	8	81	42	1.929	53	
5	Edgware	38	20	8	10	77	38	2.026	48	
6	Leyton-Wingate	38	18	12	8	72	46	1.565	48	
7	Welling United	38	19	8	11	62	48	1.292	46	Transferred to Southern League Southern Division
8	Woodford Town	38	18	9	11	84	53	1.585	45	
9	Burnham	38	20	4	14	62	45	1.378	44	
10	Harefield United	38	16	10	12	67	51	1.314	42	
11	Ruislip Manor	38	14	13	11	49	51	0.961	41	
12	Uxbridge	38	11	13	14	38	39	0.974	35	
13	Fleet Town	38	8	13	17	50	65	0.769	29	
14	Haringey Borough	38	9	10	19	41	68	0.603	28	
15	Redhill	38	8	11	19	45	59	0.763	27	
16	Hoddesdon Town	38	10	6	22	53	80	0.663	26	
17	Chertsey Town	38	9	7	22	30	84	0.357	25	
18	Marlow	38	7	10	21	43	85	0.506	24	
19	Chalfont St.Peter	38	5	5	28	39	89	0.438	15	
20	Alton Town	38	2	5	31	33	139	0.237	9	Left to join Combined Counties League Western Division

Source: fchd.info
Rules for classification: 1) points; 2) goal difference; 3) number of goals scored.
(C) Champions; (P) Promoted

=== Stadia and locations ===
Locations of the Athenian League clubs
Greater London Athenian League football clubs

Club	Stadium
Alton Town	Anstey Park
Banstead Athletic	Merland Rise
Basildon United	Gardiners Close
Burnham	The 1878 Stadium
Chalfont St Peter	Mill Meadow
Chertsey Town	Alwyns Lane
Edgware	White Lion
Fleet Town	Calthorpe Park
Grays Athletic	New Recreation Ground
Harefield United	Preston Park
Haringey Borough	Coles Park
Hoddesdon Town	Lowfield
Leyton-Wingate	Wadham Lodge
Redhill	Kiln Brow
Ruislip Manor	Grosvenor Vale
Marlow	Alfred Davis Memorial Ground
Uxbridge	Honeycroft
Welling United	Park View Road
Windsor & Eton	Stag Meadow
Woodford Town	Snakes Lane
