= 1986–87 Wessex Football League =

Wessex Football League
- Season: 1986–87
- Champions: Bashley

The 1986–87 Wessex Football League was the first season of the Wessex Football League. The champions of this inaugural season were Bashley. There was no promotion or relegation.

== League table ==
The league consisted of one division of 17 clubs. Most of the league's members were drawn from the Hampshire League Division One, except for:

- Bashley – Hampshire League Division Two
- Bournemouth, Wellworthy Athletic – Hampshire League Division Three
- Road-Sea Southampton – Southern League Premier Division
- Thatcham Town – London Spartan League
- Steyning Town – Sussex League

Pos	Team	Pld	W	D	L	GF	GA	GD	Pts	Qualification
1	Bashley (C)	32	24	3	5	71	30	+41	75	
2	Road-Sea Southampton	32	22	7	3	70	26	+44	73	Left at the end of the season
3	A.F.C. Totton	32	20	7	5	62	21	+41	67	
4	Newport (IOW)	32	15	8	9	51	36	+15	53	
5	Havant Town	32	15	7	10	57	48	+9	52	
6	Thatcham Town	32	15	6	11	53	33	+20	51	
7	Wellworthy Athletic	32	14	6	12	48	50	−2	48	
8	Eastleigh	32	14	6	12	40	42	−2	48	
9	Sholing Sports	32	10	8	14	41	45	−4	38	
10	Lymington	32	10	8	14	31	37	−6	38	
11	Steyning Town	32	10	8	14	45	47	−2	37 (Note: Steyning Town had one point deducted.)	
12	Portals Athletic	32	9	9	14	37	46	−9	36	Left at the end of the season
13	Portsmouth Royal Navy	32	11	2	19	43	58	−15	35	
14	Horndean	32	8	8	16	42	55	−13	32	
15	Bournemouth	32	7	9	16	33	59	−26	30	
16	Romsey Town	32	7	7	18	25	61	−36	28	
17	Brockenhurst	32	4	5	23	34	89	−55	17	

(C) Champions
