= Aylesbury United F.C. =

Association football club in England

Coordinates: 51°41′56″N 0°36′50″W

Aylesbury United
- Full name: Aylesbury United Football Club
- Nickname: The Ducks
- Founded: 1897
- Ground: The Meadow, Chesham
- Capacity: 5,000 (284 seated)
- Owner: Aylesbury United Supporters Trust
- Chairman: John Woodhouse
- Manager: Vacant
- League: Southern League Division One Central
- 2025–26: Southern League Division One Central, 16th of 22
Home colours	Away colours

Aylesbury United Football Club is a football club based in Chesham, Buckinghamshire, England. They are currently members of Southern League Division One Central and play at Chesham United's Meadow ground. They were based in Aylesbury until being evicted from their Buckingham Road ground in 2006. They are nicknamed the Ducks due to the Aylesbury duck.

== History ==
Aylesbury United were formed in 1897 as a merger of Night School, Printing Works and Aylesbury Town. After playing in local leagues, the club joined the Western Division of the Spartan League in 1908, which they won in their first season. This was followed by a play-off with the winners of the Eastern Division, Luton Clarence, which Aylesbury won 4–1. The following season they were placed in the league's A Division, in which they finished as runners-up. With the league becoming a single division in 1910, the club remained in it until World War I, finishing as runners-up again in 1913–14.

After the war the league expanded to two divisions, with Aylesbury placed in Division One. They remained in the division until 1928 when league re-organisation saw Division One split into East and West divisions, with Aylesbury winning Division One West in 1928–29. Further league reorganisation at the end of the season saw the creation of a Premier Division, in which Aylesbury were placed. However, after finishing bottom of the table in 1932–33 they were relegated to Division One. Two seasons later, a second-placed finish saw them promoted back to the Premier Division. The 1937–38 season saw the club relegated again, although they won Division One the following season. However, the league was then suspended due to World War II.

The league resumed in 1945 and was split into three geographic divisions, with Aylesbury in the Western Division, finishing as runners-up in 1945–46. Several clubs left the league at the end of the season, resulting in it being reduced to a single division. In 1951 Aylesbury were founder members of the Delphian League, and the 1951–52 season saw them reach the first round of the FA Cup for the first time. Drawn at home to Watford, they lost 1–0, but the attendance of 7,440 remains a club record. After finishing second in 1952–53, they were league champions the following season. The club remained in the league until it merged into the Athenian League in 1963, with Aylesbury placed in Division Two. A second-place finish in 1967–68 saw them promoted to Division One, where they remained until being relegated at the end of the 1972–73 season.

In 1976 the club joined Division One South of the Southern League, which became the Southern Division in 1979. In 1981 they were transferred to the Midland Division, and were promoted to the Premier Division after finishing as runners-up in 1984–85. The following season saw them reach the first round of the FA Cup again, this time losing 5–2 to Slough Town in a replay after a 2–2 draw. They reached the first round again in 1986–87, losing 3–2 to Bath City. In 1987–88 they won the Premier Division, earning promotion to the Football Conference; they also reached the first round of the FA Cup for the third consecutive season, this time losing 1–0 at Bristol City. At the end of the season the club were the unlikely opponents for the England national team as a warm-up match prior to Euro 88; the match attracted a record crowd of 6,031 to Buckingham Road to see England win 7–0.

Although Aylesbury were relegated at the end of the first season in the division, dropping into the Isthmian League Premier Division, a 1–0 defeat of Waterlooville saw them reach the second round of the FA Cup for the first time, where they lost 1–0 to Sutton United. They remained in the Isthmian League's Premier Division for eleven seasons, finishing as runners-up in 1998–99, and advancing to the first round of the FA Cup in every season between 1989 and 1995; the 1989–90 season saw them beat Football League opposition for the first time when they defeated Southend United 1–0, before losing by the same scoreline to Northampton Town in a second round replay. After being beaten by Walsall in the first round in 1990–91, they reached the second round again in 1991–92, eventually losing 3–2 to Hereford United. Another first round defeat took place in 1992–93 when they were beaten 8–0 at West Bromwich Albion, but the 1994–95 season saw their best performance to date, reaching the third round after defeating fellow non-League clubs Newport (IOW) and Kingstonian before losing 4–0 at QPR. The run included the "duck walk" celebration by Cliff Hercules, the club's record appearance holder and goalscorer, which was featured on the BBC's They Think It's All Over programme. In the same season they won the Isthmian League Cup.

Aylesbury were relegated to Division One in 1999–2000, but a third-place finish in 2000–01 saw them promoted back to the Premier Division; they also reached the first round of the FA Cup for the first time since 1994, this time losing 3–0 at Port Vale. In 2002–03 they reached the semi-finals of the FA Trophy, but lost 2–1 to Burscough over the two legs. In 2004 Aylesbury were transferred to the Premier Division of the Southern League, but were relegated to Division One Midlands in 2005–06. In July 2009, the Aylesbury United Supporters Trust was able to gain control of the club. However, in 2009–10 they finished bottom of the division and were relegated to the Premier Division of the Spartan South Midlands League. After finishing as runners-up in 2012–13, they were promoted to Division One Central of the Southern League.

=== Season-by-season ===
Season	Division	Position	Significant events
1908–09	Spartan League Western Division	1/6	Champions
1909–10	Spartan League A Division	2/7	
1910–11	Spartan League	4/10	
1911–12	Spartan League	5/13	
1912–13	Spartan League	6/13	
1913–14	Spartan League	2/12	
1919–20	Spartan League	4/11	
1920–21	Spartan League Division One	7/12	
1921–22	Spartan League Division One	5/14	
1922–23	Spartan League Division One	10/14	
1923–24	Spartan League Division One	4/14	
1924–25	Spartan League Division One	12/14	
1925–26	Spartan League Division One	8/15	
1926–27	Spartan League Division One	8/15	
1927–28	Spartan League Division One	8/15	
1928–29	Spartan League Division One West	1/13	Champions
1929–30	Spartan League Premier Division	10/14	
1930–31	Spartan League Premier Division	10/14	
1931–32	Spartan League Premier Division	7/13	
1932–33	Spartan League Premier Division	14/14	Relegated
1933–34	Spartan League Division One	4/14	
1934–35	Spartan League Division One	2/14	Promoted
1935–36	Spartan League Premier Division	12/14	
1936–37	Spartan League Premier Division	10/14	
1937–38	Spartan League Premier Division	13/14	Relegated
1938–39	Spartan League Division One	1/14	Promoted
1945–46	Spartan League Western Division	2/10	League reduced to single division
1946–47	Spartan League	10/14	
1947–48	Spartan League	6/14	
1948–49	Spartan League	10/14	
1949–50	Spartan League	3/14	
1950–51	Spartan League	3/14	
1951–52	Delphian League	6/14	
1952–53	Delphian League	2/16	
1953–54	Delphian League	1/15	Champions
1954–55	Delphian League	3/15	
1955–56	Delphian League	5/15	
1956–57	Delphian League	4/14	
1957–58	Delphian League	5/15	
1958–59	Delphian League	7/15	
1959–60	Delphian League	5/13	
1960–61	Delphian League	9/15	
1961–62	Delphian League	5/14	
1962–63	Delphian League	Abandoned	Delphian League merged into Athenian League
1963–64	Athenian League Division Two	13/15	
1964–65	Athenian League Division Two	13/16	
1965–66	Athenian League Division Two	15/16	
1966–67	Athenian League Division Two	10/16	
1967–68	Athenian League Division Two	2/16	Promoted
1968–69	Athenian League Division One	11/16	
1969–70	Athenian League Division One	11/16	
1970–71	Athenian League Division One	10/16	
1971–72	Athenian League Division One	15/16	
1972–73	Athenian League Division One	15/16	Relegated
1973–74	Athenian League Division Two	10/16	
1974–75	Athenian League Division Two	11/15	
1975–76	Athenian League Division Two	9/16	Joined the Southern League
1976–77	Southern League Division One South	18	
1977–78	Southern League Division One South	6/20	
1978–79	Southern League Division One South	10/21	Moved to Southern Division
1979–80	Southern League Southern Division	2/24	
1980–81	Southern League Southern Division	11/24	
1981–82	Southern League Southern Division	11/24	Moved to Midland Division
1982–83	Southern League Midland Division	13/17	
1983–84	Southern League Midland Division	5/20	
1984–85	Southern League Midland Division	2/18	Promoted
1985–86	Southern League Premier Division	8/20	
1986–87	Southern League Premier Division	3/22	
1987–88	Southern League Premier Division	1/22	Champions, promoted
1988–89	Football Conference	20/21	Relegated
1989–90	Isthmian League Premier Division	3/22	
1990–91	Isthmian League Premier Division	3/22	
1991–92	Isthmian League Premier Division	7/22	
1992–93	Isthmian League Premier Division	10/22	
1993–94	Isthmian League Premier Division	12/22	
1994–95	Isthmian League Premier Division	4/22	
1995–96	Isthmian League Premier Division	11/22	
1996–97	Isthmian League Premier Division	7/22	
1997–98	Isthmian League Premier Division	18/22	
1998–99	Isthmian League Premier Division	2/22	
1999–2000	Isthmian League Premier Division	20/22	Relegated
2000–01	Isthmian League Division One	14/22	
2001–02	Isthmian League Division One	3/22	Promoted
2002–03	Isthmian League Premier Division	17/24	
2003–04	Isthmian League Premier Division	24/24	Transferred to Southern League
2004–05	Southern League Premier Division	10/22	
2005–06	Southern League Premier Division	21/22	Relegated
2006–07	Southern League Division One Midlands	6/22	
2007–08	Southern League Division One Midlands	8/21	
2008–09	Southern League Division One Midlands	10/22	
2009–10	Southern League Division One Midlands	22/22	Relegated
2010–11	Spartan South Midlands League Premier Division	6/23	
2011–12	Spartan South Midlands League Premier Division	4/22	
2012–13	Spartan South Midlands League Premier Division	2/22	Promoted
2013–14	Southern League Division One Central	12/22	
2014–15	Southern League Division One Central	13/22	
2015–16	Southern League Division One Central	19/22	
2016–17	Southern League Division One Central	13/22	
2017–18	Southern League Division One East	13/22	Division renamed
2018–19	Southern League Division One Central	15/20	Division name reverted
2019–20	Southern League Division One Central	–	Season abandoned due to the COVID-19 pandemic
2020–21	Southern League Division One Central	–	Season abandoned due to the COVID-19 pandemic
2021–22	Southern League Division One Central	14/20	
2024–25	Southern League Division One Central	15/21	
2025–26	Southern League Division One Central	16/22	
Source: Non-League Matters, Football Club History Database

== Ground ==
Aylesbury played at Turnfurlong Lane until moving to Buckingham Road in the mid-1980s. In July 2006 the lease on the ground expired and they were forced to play matches outside the town. They played at the Meadow in Chesham (groundsharing with Chesham United), before moving to Bell Close in Leighton Buzzard in 2009, where they shared with Leighton Town. In 2015 they began a groundshare at Thame United's Meadow View Park. The club moved back to Chesham United's Meadow ground in 2017.

== Honours ==
- Southern League
  - Premier Division champions 1987–88
- Isthmian League
  - League Cup winners 1994–95
- Delphian League
  - Champions 1953–54
- Spartan League
  - League champions 1908–09
  - Western Division champions 1908–09
  - Division One West champions 1928–29
  - Division One champions 1938–39
- Spartan South Midlands League
  - Premier Division Cup winners 2012–13
- Berks & Bucks Senior Cup
  - Winners 1913–14, 1985–86, 1996–97, 1999–2000
- Berks & Bucks Senior Shield
  - Winners 2012–13
- Berks & Bucks Benevolent Cup
  - Winners 1932–33, 1933–34, 1952–53, 1953–54

== Records ==
- Best FA Cup performance: Third round, 1994–95
- Best FA Trophy performance: Semi-final, 2002–03
- Best FA Vase performance: Fourth round, 1975–76
- Record attendance:
  - Turnfurlong Lane: 7,440 vs Watford, FA Cup first round, 1951–52
  - Buckingham Road: 6,031 vs England, friendly match, 4 June 1988
- Most Appearances: Jack Wood, 670 (2010–present)
- Record Goalscorer: Cliff Hercules, 301 (1984–2002)
- Biggest win: 10–0 vs Hornchurch & Upminster, Delphian League, 17 April 1954
- Heaviest defeat: 10–1 vs Tilbury, Athenian League Division Two, 19 October 1963; 10–1 vs Harlow Town, Athenian League Division Two, 7 March 1964; 9–0 vs Bishop's Stortford, Delphian League, 8 October 1955

== See also ==
- Aylesbury United F.C. players
- Aylesbury United F.C. managers
