= PAC International =

American manufacturing company

PAC International, LLC.
- Type: Private
- Industry: Architectural Acoustics
- Founded: 1993
- Founder: Carmen Gernhart; Elzo Gernhart
- Headquarters: Las Vegas, NV, Clark County, Nevada, U.S.
- Area served: North and South America
- Products: RSIC Noise Control
- Website: www.pac-intl.com

PAC International, LLC. manufactures a complete line of acoustical noise control products for use in residential (single-family housing and multiple-family housing) and commercial building construction.

The company introduced the first rubber isolator, the RSIC-1 (Resilient Sound Isolation Clip) product in 2000. Resilient Sound Isolation Clips are sold throughout the Americas. RSIC-1 was engineered to provide noise control and be both cost effective and environmentally friendly.

PAC International's noise control products help buildings exceed the International Building Code requirements for both fire and sound. The RSIC-1 product is the only noise control product classified by Underwriters Laboratories (UL) for both fire and sound; and the PAC Line of Products is UL Classified for use in over 189 fire resistive design assemblies.

== RSIC family of products ==
RSIC and RSIC-1 are registered trademarks of PAC International, Inc. RSIC has become the brand name for a family of Resilient Sound Isolation Clip products that are used extensively in residential and commercial building construction.

- RSIC-1
- RSIC-SIX (Spring Isolator X)
- RC-1 Boost
- RSIC-HWI (Hanger Wall Isolator)
- RSIC-SI-1 Ultra (Spring Isolator)
- RSIC-SI-CRC (Spring Isolator for Cold Rolled Channel)
- RSIC-SI-WHI (Spring Isolator/Wire Hanger Isolator)
- RSIC-SI-FF Series (Full Frame Spring Isolators)
- RSIC-1 EXT04
- RSIC-1.5 CRC (Cold Rolled Channel)
- RSIC-1 LP (Low Profile)
- RSIC-1-Edge
- RSIC-1 TTC (Tube Truss Connector)
- RSIC-1 Retro
- RSIC-1 Backer
- RSIC-1 Backer HD
- RSIC-1 ADM (Adjustable Direct Mount)
- RSIC-1 ADM Mini Drop
- RSIC-1 ADM Wood
- RSIC-U
- RISC-U-HD
- RSIC-AMI (Acoustic Mullion Isolator)
- RSIC-WFI (Wall Frame Isolator)
- RSIC-FGP (Fiberglass Pad)
- RSIC-DC04
- RSIC-DC04 HD
- RSIC-DC04 X2
- RSIC-DC04 X2 HD/DD
- RSIC-V
- RSIC-FCR-HD (Furring Channel Retainer)
- RSIC-2
- RSIC-2 RETRO
- RSIC-CWB (Chase Wall Brace)
- RSIC-CWB HD/DD (Heavy Duty/Double Deflection)
- RSIC-CWB HD/DD DC (Heavy Duty/Double Deflection/Deflection Control)
- RSIC Joist Isolator
- RSIC-GDS Kits
- RSIC-FS (Flat Screen Television Isolation Mount)
- RSIC-PT (Perimeter Tape)
- RSIC Putty Pads
- RSIC Multi Clip
- RSIC Leveling Clip

== History ==
PAC International, Inc. is a privately held corporation that began over 20 years ago. The company is now headquartered in Oregon.

PAC International is a company that strives to “give back” to society by exemplifying social responsibility practices, including manufacturing products in the United States and having RSIC-1 products assembled within the local community. Product assembly is performed by adults with intellectual disabilities working through Opportunity Village, a non-profit community rehabilitation organization.

== Management ==
- Carmen Gernhart, President & AP/AR Coordinator
- Elzo Gernhart, President & Research and Development
- Mike Gernhart, Vice President & Research and Development
- Michael Raley, Acoustical Engineer & Research and Development
- Taylor Gernhart, Marketing Director & Coordinator
- Kelly Gernhart, Accounting Director & Coordinator
- Alisha Meyers, Customer Relations & Sales Manager
- Dalton Gernhart, Warehouse Production & Management
- Alyssa Gernhart, Analyst & Marketing Assistant
