= Road-Sea Southampton F.C. =

- Full name: Road-Sea Southampton Football Club
- Founded: 1970; 56 years ago
- Dissolved: 1987; 39 years ago
- Ground: Road-Sea Park, Marchwood
Home colours	Away colours

R.S. Southampton were a semi-professional football club, based at Marchwood - a village near Totton in Hampshire.

Commonly referred to locally as Road-Sea, they were best known for directly moving from Sunday parks football into the semi-professional Southern League.

== History ==
The club was originally known as Echo Social and played in the City of Southampton Sunday League with great success. In 1973, they were re-named Road-Sea for sponsorship reasons - after the freight shipping company owned by player-manager Peter Price. In 1976–77 they reached the semi-final of the national FA Sunday Cup.

With considerable financial backing, the club purchased some land at Marchwood, and soon developed the site into an impressive facility. This resulted in an ambitious application to join the semi-professional Southern League being surprisingly accepted in 1982, despite having no previous history of playing Saturday football.

The club then became known as RS Southampton and soon silenced their critics as they pushed for promotion from the Southern Division. After finishing a creditable 3rd in their debut season behind Fisher Athletic and Folkestone, they were champions in 1983–84. They also enjoyed a fine run in the FA Vase, reaching Round 5 before being eliminated 1–2 away at Leyton Wingate.

Road-Sea continued to thrive in the highly competitive Premier Division as they then finished 5th in 1984–85. The following season was much tougher and they finished mid-table.

In 1986 Road-Sea became founder members of the newly created Wessex League, and just missed out on the inaugural title after finishing runners-up to Bashley. This was mainly due to a huge fixture backlog caused by their cup exploits, which saw them reach four finals. In the Hampshire Senior Cup they lost 0-2 against Portsmouth Reserves at Fratton Park - but won both the League and Russell Cotes Cups, defeating Sholing Sports in both finals. There was further success on 19th May when they won the South-West Counties Transformer Vase, defeating Clump Inn 4-1 in the second-leg of the final at Marchwood.

However, this would soon prove be their last ever game as Price suddenly disbanded the club and retired.

== Honours ==
- Southern League
  - Southern Division Champions 1983–84
- Wessex League
  - Runners-up 1986–87
  - League Cup Winners 1986–87
- Hampshire Football Association
  - Senior Cup Finalists 1986-87
  - Russell Cotes Cup Winners 1983-84 and 1986-87
- Other
  - South West Counties Transformer Vase Winners 1979-80, 1983-84 and 1986-87

== Playing records ==
=== League ===
Season	Division	Position	Significant events
1982/83	Southern League Southern Division	3/18	
1983/84	Southern League Southern Division	1/20	Champions, Promoted
1984/85	Southern League Premier Division	5/20	
1985/86	Southern League Premier Division	16/20	Left competition
1986/87	Wessex League	2/17	Runners-up - left competition

=== FA Cup ===
Season	Round	Opponents	Result
1982/83	Did not enter		
1983/84	Preliminary Round	H v Oxford City	W 4–1
	1st Qualifying Round	H v Waterlooville	D 0-0
	Replay	A v Waterlooville	L 1–2
1984/85	1st Qualifying Round	A v Melksham Town	W 3–0
	2nd Qualifying Round	A v Chippenham Town	D 2-2
	Replay	H v Chippenham Town	L 1–2
1985/86	1st Qualifying Round	A v Redditch United	D 1-1
	Replay	H v Redditch United	W 3–2
	2nd Qualifying Round	H v Clandown	W 2–1
	3rd Qualifying Round	A v Ton Pentre	D 1-1
	Replay	H v Ton Pentre	L 1–2
1986/87	1st Qualifying Round	A v Littlehampton Town	W 7–1
	2nd Qualifying Round	A v Devizes Town	W 2–0
	3rd Qualifying Round	H v Fareham Town	L 0–3

=== FA Trophy ===
Season	Round	Opponents	Result
1984/85	1st Qualifying Round	A v Taunton Town	L 0–2
1985/86	1st Qualifying Round	A v Andover	W 3–0
	2nd Qualifying Round	H v Bridgend Town	D 1-1
	Replay	A v Bridgend Town	L 0–3

=== FA Vase ===
Season	Round	Opponents	Result
1982/83	Did not enter		
1983/84	Preliminary Round	A v Pagham	W 3–1
	Round 1	A v Chobham	W 5–0
	Round 2	H v Maidenhead United	W 4–2
	Round 3	H v Exmouth Town	W 3–0
	Round 4	H v Exmouth Town	W 3–0
	Round 5	A v Leyton Wingate	L 1–2
1986/87	Preliminary Round	A v Warminster Town	W 5–0
	Round 1	A v Lymington Town	D 1-1
	Replay	H v Lymington Town	D 1-1
	Replay	H v Lymington Town	L 0–2

== Ground ==
Road-Sea Southampton played at the self-titled Road-Sea Park, Long Lane in Marchwood, near Totton.

Following their demise, the ground was renamed 'Staplewood' and later sold to Southampton F.C., who initially used it for reserves and youth team games. The venue has since been redeveloped in to a large training complex with world class facilities.

== Notable players ==
- See Road-Sea Southampton players.

== Local rivalries ==
Road-Sea had a number of local rivals during various stages of their unusual career, ranging from Sunday park sides to the likes of the regions semi-professional Southern League clubs. Their closet neighbours were AFC Totton who they met during their solitary season as members of the Wessex League.
