= William Beadling =

English footballer

Personal information
- Date of birth: 21 August 1885
- Place of birth: Sunderland, Tyne and Wear, England
- Date of death: 1944 (aged 58–59)
- Position: Winger

Senior career*
Years	Team	Apps	(Gls)
1907–1908	Ashington		
1908–1909	Grimsby Town	25	(5)
1909	Northampton Town		
1909–1910	Grimsby Town	10	(0)
1910–1911	Ashington		
1911	Wallsend Park Villa		
1911–191?	Blyth Spartans		
- * Club domestic league appearances and goals

William Beadling (21 August 1885 – 1944) was an English professional footballer who played as a winger.
