= Leicester United F.C. =

Leicester United
- Full name: Leicester United Football Club
- Nickname: United
- Founded: 1900; 126 years ago (as Enderby Town); 2023; 3 years ago (reformed)
- Club Parent Company: The Richard Moore Sports CIC
- Chairman: Neil Lawrence
- Managers: Men's First Women's First: Phil Wadsworth TBC
- League: Leicestershire Everards Senior League
- 2024-25: Leicestershire Everards Senior League Division 2, 20th
- Website: http://leicesterunitedfc.com
Home colours	Away colours	Third colours

Leicester United Football Club is an English football team based in the East Midlands city of Leicester, Leicestershire. They were originally formed in 1900, as Enderby Town. For many years, they were the second top side in Leicestershire. The highest the club finished was 8th in the Southern League Premier Division in 1987–88. The Southern League Premier Division at that time was the 6th tier of English football.

They were wound up in 1996, four years away from their centenary.

In March 2023, a new club was formed with the name Leicester United. In their debut season in 2024/25 they played at Holmes Park, Blaby, before moving to their own ground at Blaby Road Park, South Wigston.

== History ==
In 1900 a group of quarry workers founded Enderby Town Football Club.

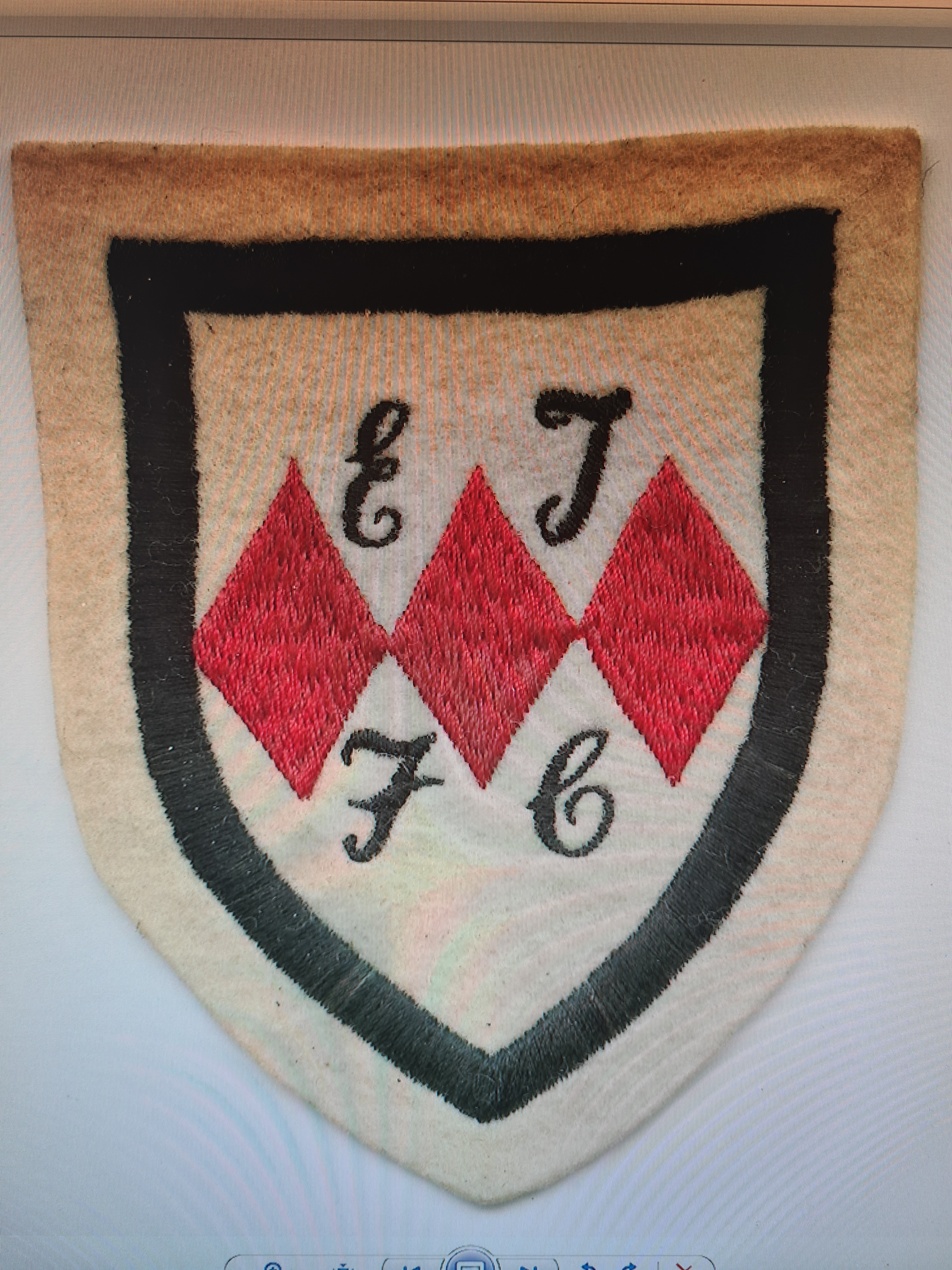

The secretary was a Sunderland supporter and he was determined the club should wear the colours of his favourite team, red and white stripes.

The club's first ground was at George Street, Enderby. Town established itself in local minor leagues before moving up to the Leicestershire Senior League.

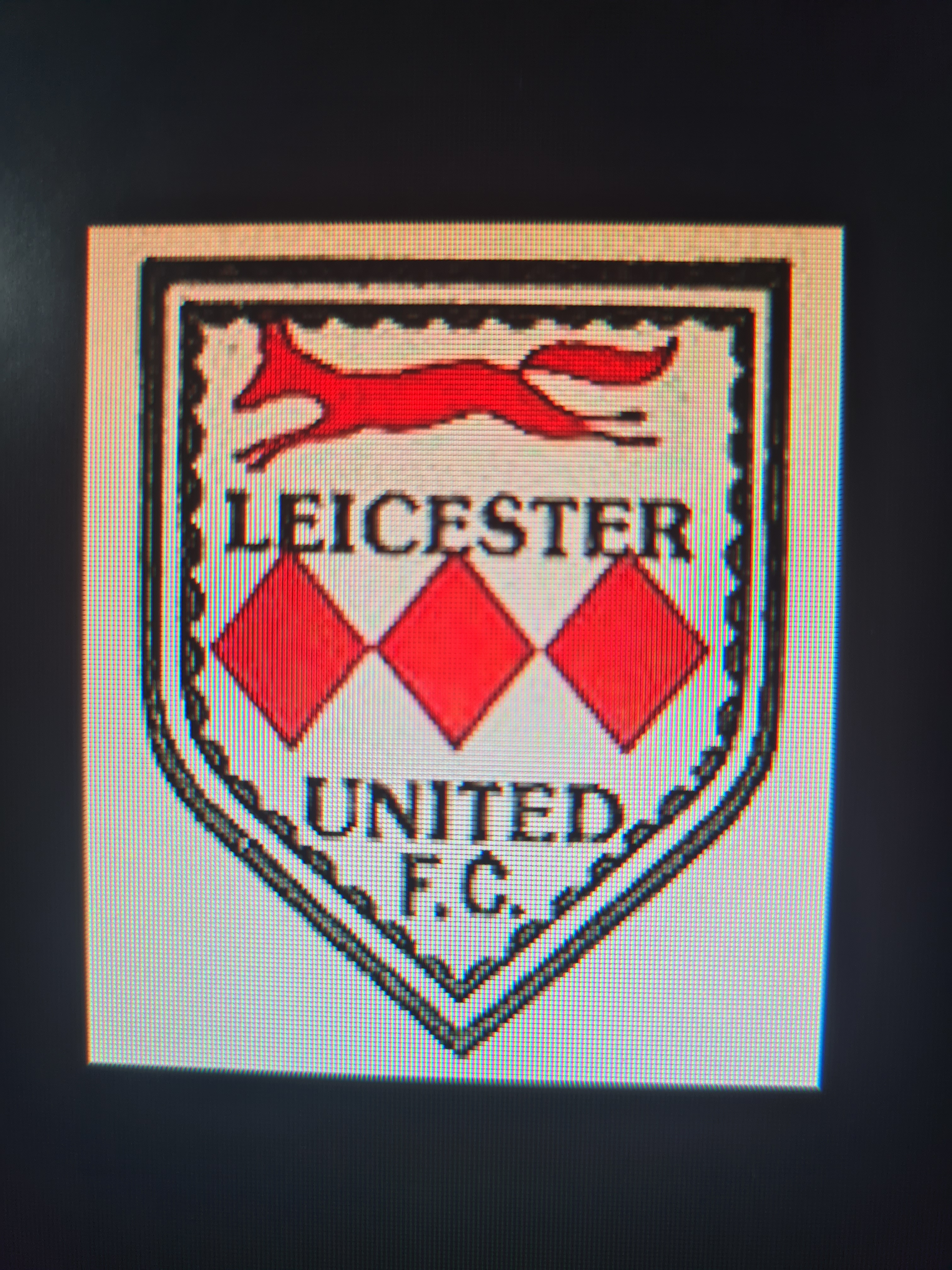

After winning Division 2 in 1958-59 the club became a dominant force in the 1960s, winning the Division One title three times and also lifting the Leicestershire Senior Cup on three occasions.

The club moved into the East Midlands Regional League in the 1970–71 season, winning the league and cup double in their first season and retaining the league title in their second.

In 1972 the club was elected to the Southern League to replace Hereford United, who had been promoted to the Football League Division 4. The next 11 years saw them achieve six top ten finishes. The Leicestershire Senior Cup was won again in 1972-73 and 1978–79.

The 1980s saw a change in fortune, the club being relegated from the Premier Division in 1982–83, after which the club moved to a new ground, United Park, in Winchester Road, Blaby. At the same time their name was changed to Leicester United. Form continued to decline and United finished bottom of the Midland Division in 1984–85.

After finishing Midland Division runners-up in 1986–87, United achieved promotion back to the Premier Division and achieved another top ten finish the following season. The next season they were relegated back to the Midland Division.

== FA Cup runs ==
The club's best FA Cup run came in the 1977–78 season (as Enderby Town) where they reached the 1st Round proper of the competition. They lost 6–1 away to AP Leamington in that round.

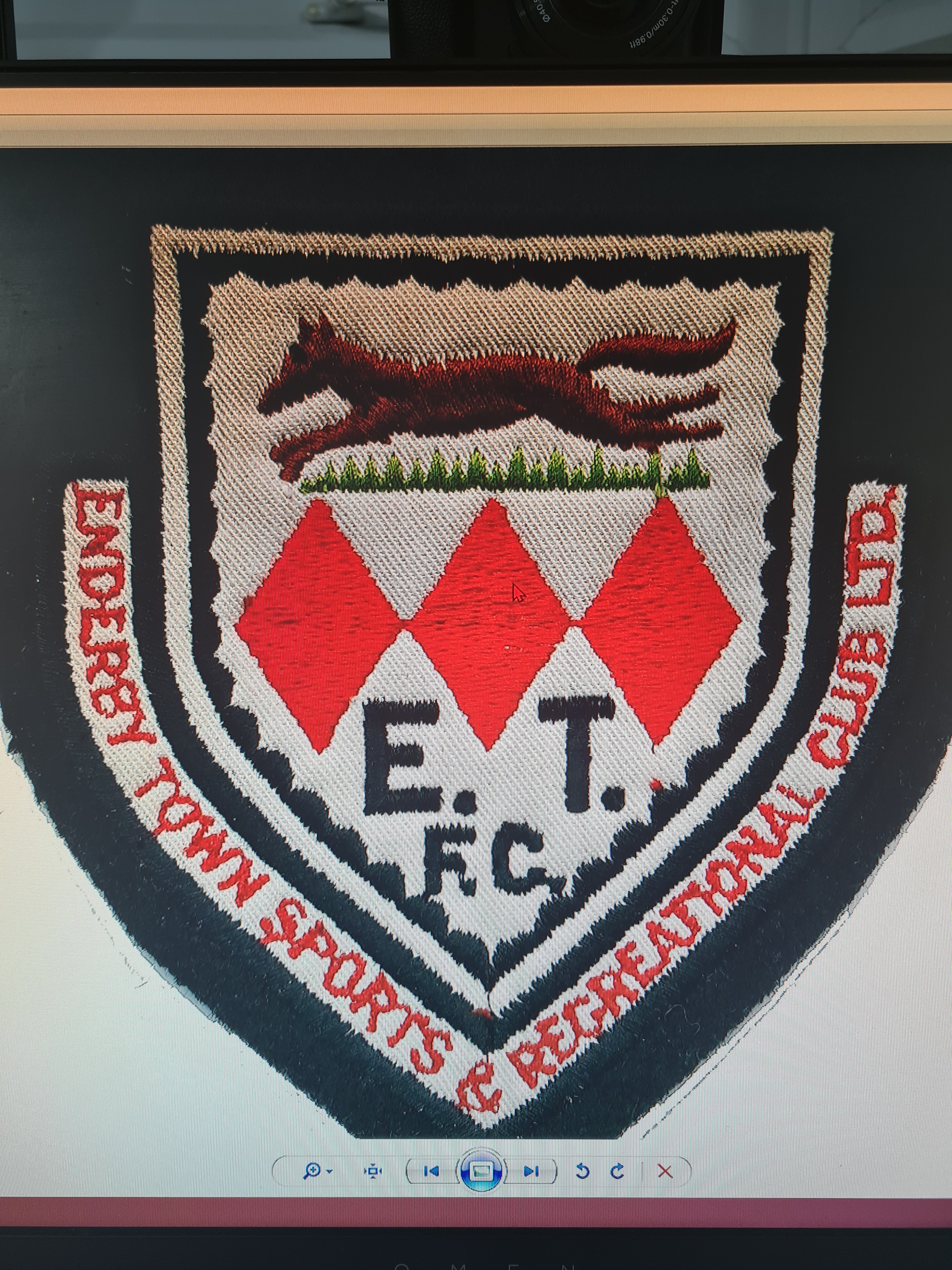

In 1986–87, they played their only ever 'home' match at the home stadium of local rivals Leicester City. It was an FA Cup 1st Qualifying Round Replay in which United beat North Ferriby United 4–2.

The club's last FA Cup tie was a 5–2 away defeat to Bilston Town in the 2nd Qualifying Round in the 1995–96 season.

== 2023 - Onwards ==
In 2023 a new club was formed and joined Division Two of the Everards Brewery Senior League. Debuting in 2024/25 their first two seasons ended winless, with club finishing in last (20th) place. On the 10th of October 2026, Leicester United F.C. finally won their first game as a club, beating Barrow Town Reserves 4-2.

== Club honours & records ==
=== Enderby Town FC ===
- Best FA Cup performance: First round, 1977–78
- Best FA Trophy performance: Third round, 1978–79 (replay)
- Leicestershire Senior League Division Two Champions 1956–57
- Leicestershire Senior League Champions 1962–63, 1964–65, 1966-67

=== Leicester United FC ===
- Best FA Cup performance: Third qualifying round, 1988–89 (replay), 1990–91, 1995–96
- Best FA Trophy performance: Second round, 1988–89

== League record ==
In their final season before being dissolved, 1995–96, they finished 16th in the Southern League Midlands Division. They went out of business just a few games into the start of the 1996–97 season due to financial problems, one of their final games being a victory over Grantham Town.

== See also ==
- Leicester United F.C. players
- Enderby Town Football Club Ltd v The Football Association Ltd
