= Bromsgrove Rovers F.C. =

Defunct English Football club, based in Worcestershire

Bromsgrove Rovers
- Full name: Bromsgrove Rovers Football Club
- Nicknames: The Rovers, The Greens
- Founded: 1885
- Dissolved: 2010
- Ground: Victoria Ground
- Capacity: 4,893
- 2009–10: Southern League; Division One Midlands, 20th
Home colours	Away colours

Bromsgrove Rovers F.C. was a non-League football club from the town of Bromsgrove in Worcestershire. The peak of the club's success was in 1993 when Rovers finished runner-up in the Football Conference. They went into administration during the 2009–10 season while they were playing in the Southern League Division One (Midlands) and were thrown out of the league before the 2010–11 season for not having a ground to play at. Their ground is today used by successor club Bromsgrove Sporting.

== History ==
=== The first years ===
Bromsgrove Rovers were formed in 1885 and initially played in the local Studley & District League, during which time they played on at least four grounds before arriving at Victoria Ground in 1910. Rovers were promoted to the Birmingham & District League in 1898, where they were runners up in the 1904–05 season. The club switched to the Birmingham Combination in 1908, where they were to remain until 1954 when it was absorbed into the Birmingham & District League [later renamed the West Midlands (Regional) League]. Rovers were champions of the Combination on two occasions (1946–47 & 1959–60) and runners-up on four other occasions. The club also made the FA Cup first round proper for the first time in 1947, losing 2–1 to Aldershot. Long-serving managers during this period were Joe Wainwright (known affectionately as 'Gentleman Joe') and former Birmingham City goalkeeper Gill Merrick.

In 1972, Rovers joined the Southern Football League, initially in Division One North. In 1979, the league was re-organised and they were placed in the Midland Division. After a series of relatively uneventful seasons, the former Scottish international and West Bromwich Albion legend Bobby Hope was appointed manager. Hope transformed the club's ambitions, and Rovers won the Midland Division in 1985–86 to gain a place in the Premier Division. Rovers also won the Southern League Cup that season to achieve a league/cup double. In 1986–87, Rovers almost gained back to back promotions but finished Premier Division runners-up to Fisher Athletic.

This was the start of the most successful period in the club's history, particularly under the management of Bobby Hope. After five years of consolidation, the 1991–92 season saw a remarkable run of 15 consecutive home wins to pip Dover Athletic to the Premier Division title with a game to spare. This saw Bromsgrove promoted to the Football Conference, the highest level of non-league football in England.

=== Football Conference ===
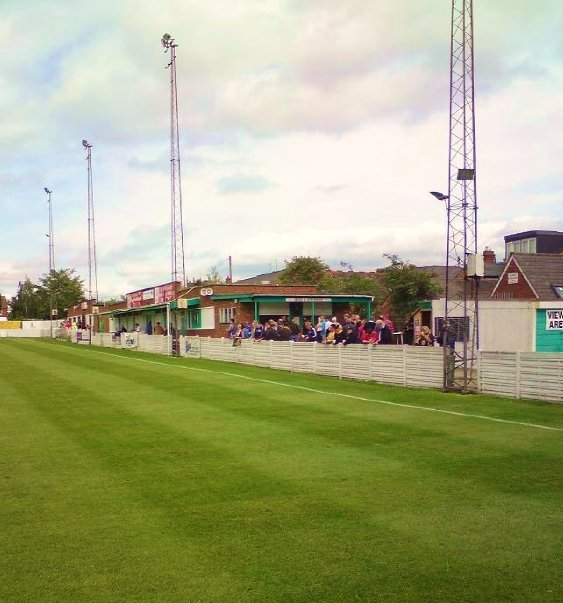
Victoria Ground clubhouse

The remarkable form from the promotion season continued during the 1992–93 season. Bromsgrove were one of the smallest clubs in the Conference, yet managed to finish runners-up to the eventual champions Wycombe Wanderers, albeit with a 15-point gap between the teams. One of the many highlights was a 1–0 home victory over Wycombe, one of only seven league defeats suffered by Martin O'Neill's champions that season.

The following season, 1993–94, saw Bromsgrove get past the first round (proper) of the FA Cup for the first time, claiming their only ever league scalp with an away 2–1 victory over Northampton Town. After another away victory in the second round (against fellow Conference side Yeovil Town), Bromsgrove were drawn at home to Barnsley. A capacity crowd of 4,893 was in attendance for the game. Bromsgrove were 1–0 up with just two minutes of time remaining, when Barnsley scored two late goals to end up winners. In post-match comments, the Barnsley manager Viv Anderson described his team as "the luckiest in the world".

After their cup exit, Rovers endured a poor run of league results and had to rely on a 1–0 away win at league runners-up Kettering Town in the final match to avoid relegation. The 1994–95 season saw the departure of Bobby Hope, frustrated at the club's financial constraints. His replacement was former Republic of Ireland international Tony Grealish who only lasted a few months. The club had to appoint captain Kevin Richardson and Youth Team Manager John Dyer on a temporary basis, but were rewarded when Bromsgrove won the Conference League Cup (or "Spalding Cup" at the time). In fact they became the first team in the competition's history to win it back to back. The 1994–95 final saw Bromsgrove involved in a high scoring 10–2 aggregate victory over Kettering Town. In the 1995–96 final Rovers beat Macclesfield Town 4–2 on aggregate.

Bromsgrove were relegated from the Conference back to the Southern League in 1996–97. By this time, Brian Kenning was in charge, and many of the club's finest players had also either left, retired, or were past their best. These included the inspirational captain Kevin 'Psycho' Richardson, Paul Webb (who controversially left to join local rivals Kidderminster Harriers), Chris Hanks (Rovers' all-time top-scorer with 236 goals in 424 appearances), Shaun O'Meara (763 appearances for the club), Scott Cooksey (sold to Peterborough United), Steve Taylor (sold to Crystal Palace) and Martin O'Connor, who went on to have a successful league career with Birmingham City.

=== Later years ===
After this, the club went into an almost constant decline. Their relegation to the Southern League Premier Division in 1996–97 was followed by relegation to Division One West in 1998–99 and then to the Midland Football Alliance in 2000–01. Promotion back to the Southern League was gained at the first attempt under the management of Gary Hackett and Jon Ford, but the club still found itself a long way removed from its successes of the early 1990s. From an average support of 1,500 per game in the first Conference season, attendance was frequently as low as the mid 200s.

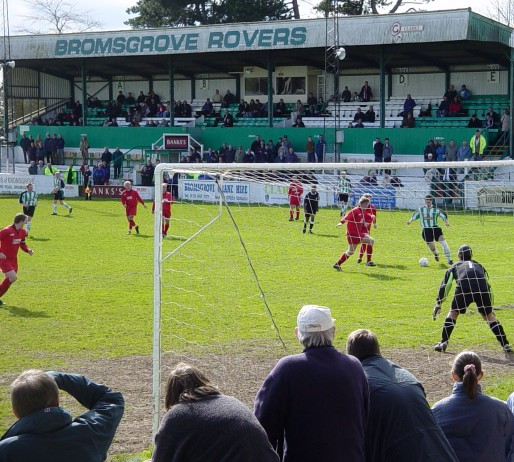
Home game at Victoria Ground

In the 2006–07 season, with Rod Brown as manager, Bromsgrove reached the Division One West playoffs, as they finished runners up to Brackley Town. They defeated Evesham United 1–0 in the semi-final then came from a goal down in the final to beat Willenhall Town 2–1 in the final, returning to the Southern League Premier Division for the 2007–08 season.

After a bright start to 2007–08, a poor run of results saw manager Rod Brown dismissed. Duane Darby was put in temporary charge and initial results saw the team climb back into the top half of the table. Needing only three wins to guarantee Premier Division status (out of the last 10) the team plummeted to an abysmal run of results, with Darby still in control, which included defeats at already relegated Cheshunt and Cirencester Town. A final day defeat at Rugby Town (Rod Brown's new team) saw Bromsgrove Rovers relegated leading to protests against the controlling shareholder and sole director, Tom Herbert, in the close season and an attempted takeover by a fans' consortium.

Darby was sacked after a poor start to the 2008–09 season which led to Rod Brown returning to the club from Rugby for a second stint as manager. Results under Brown did improve but Bromsgrove finished the season in 13th place with rumours continuing to circulate about the club's future. At the end of the season, Rod Brown resigned as manager to take over as manager of Midland Football Alliance team Stratford Town. Former player and fans' favourite John Snape was announced as the new manager in mid May.

=== Financial trouble ===
An unbeaten seven game start to the 2009–10 season and possibilities of a promotion run were abruptly brought back down to earth with first the presentation of a winding-up petition and then director Tom Herbert requesting a court order to appoint an acquaintance of Director of Football, Steve Daniels, as administrator. Information provided in the Administration application showed that the club's creditors figure had risen from £127,141 in May 2008 to £533,265 in September 2009 with no corresponding increase in assets. The fans' consortium which attempted to take over the club at the end of the 2007–08 season was thought to be attempting to secure the future of the club through a Community Interest Company, but it was announced in November that a bid had been accepted from a man named Mike Ward. In spite of the announcement, in May 2010, the sale still did not appear to have been completed and the intended aim of winding up the club was still awaited. The club meanwhile had narrowly escaped relegation and gates had reached new lows.

With the lease of the Victoria Ground expiring in the close season, the landlord announced that it was open to applications for a new lease. The fans' consortium announced that they had started a new club – Bromsgrove Sporting – and had applied for the lease. On 4 June 2010, the District Council announced that Bromsgrove Sporting were to be awarded the new lease for the ground, it was planned that Bromsgrove Rovers would continue to play their home matches there. Negotiations with Sporting stalled however when Rovers said that they could not afford to pay the hire charge (having told the Council that they did not plan to pay rent when applying for the new lease) and at the time of expiry of the lease in early August it appeared that Rovers were intending to occupy the ground until a court order removed them. On 11 August 2010, Rovers were thrown out of the Southern League after not being able to show that they had a ground to play at. Manager and director of football Steve Daniels resigned, and the club did not play football thereafter.

== Club records ==
- Best league position: 2nd in Conference (level 5), 1992–93
- Best FA Cup performance: 3rd round, 1993–94
- Best FA Trophy performance: Quarter-final replay, 1975–76
- Best FA Vase performance: 3rd round, 2001–02
- Best Conference Cup Result: Winners, 1994–95 & 1995–96.
