= 1979–80 in English football =

Football in England
- Season: 1979–80

Men's football
- First Division: Liverpool
- Second Division: Leicester City
- Third Division: Grimsby Town
- Fourth Division: Huddersfield Town
- Alliance Premier League: Altrincham
- FA Cup: West Ham United
- League Cup: Wolverhampton Wanderers
- Charity Shield: Liverpool

The 1979–80 season was the 100th season of competitive football in England.

== Diary of the season ==
11 August 1979: League champions Liverpool defeat FA Cup holders Arsenal 3–1 at Wembley Stadium to win the Charity Shield.

18 August 1979: Arsenal move straight to the top of the First Division table with a 4–0 away win against newly promoted Brighton & Hove Albion on the first day of the League season. The first round of fixtures in the inaugural season of the Alliance Premier League, now the National League, takes place.

31 August 1979: The first month of the season ends with Norwich City, who have never even finished in the top five of the First Division, leading the League alongside 1978 champions Nottingham Forest, after both teams win their first three matches. Middlesbrough are one point behind the leaders. At the bottom, Tottenham Hotspur and Brighton & Hove Albion have yet to gain a point.

5 September 1979: Manchester City sign midfielder Steve Daley from Wolverhampton Wanderers for a national record fee of £1,437,500. In the League Cup second round, braces for Ian Bowyer and John Robertson contribute to Nottingham Forest firing six past Blackburn Rovers.

8 September 1979: The national transfer record fee is broken for the second time in four days when Wolverhampton Wanderers pay almost £1,500,000 for Aston Villa and Scotland striker Andy Gray.

30 September 1979: September ends with newly promoted Crystal Palace, unbeaten after eight games, topping the First Division on goal difference from Manchester United and Nottingham Forest. After losing twice this month, Liverpool occupy ninth place. Derby County, champions in 1972 and 1975, are bottom of the table, joined in the relegation zone by Stoke City and Tottenham Hotspur.

3 October 1979: Liverpool are knocked out of the European Cup 4–2 on aggregate by Dinamo Tbilisi.

13 October 1979: Kazimierz Deyna scores the only goal as Manchester City beat Nottingham Forest, knocking the Midlands club into second place, behind Manchester United. Crystal Palace's unbeaten start to the season ends with a 3–1 defeat to Everton at Goodison Park.

31 October 1979: Manchester United end October as First Division leaders, one point ahead of Nottingham Forest, with Liverpool, Norwich City, Crystal Palace, Wolverhampton Wanderers and Tottenham Hotspur a further two points adrift. Brighton & Hove Albion now occupy bottom place behind Derby County, while Bolton Wanderers have dropped into the relegation zone.

24 November 1979: Joe Jordan's brace helps Manchester United put five past Norwich without reply, struggling Ipswich Town turn over Southampton while Derby County are the victors in the East Midlands derby, beating Nottingham Forest 4–1.

30 November 1979: November ends with Manchester United still top of the First Division, one point ahead of Liverpool. Crystal Palace remain in contention, two points behind the leaders, and Middlesbrough have joined the chasing pack. Bolton Wanderers, Brighton & Hove Albion and Ipswich Town occupy the relegation zone.

26 December 1979: The Steel City derby in the Third Division sees Sheffield Wednesday beat Sheffield United 4–0, attracting a crowd of nearly 50,000.

31 December 1979: The decade ends with Liverpool narrowly ahead of Manchester United at the top of the First Division, having won the clash between the two on Boxing Day. Southampton and Arsenal lead the chasing group, but are eight points behind the leaders. Crystal Palace have fallen to ninth place. Bristol City have joined Derby County and Bolton Wanderers in the relegation zone.

5 January 1980: Fourth Division Halifax Town cause the upset of the FA Cup third round by beating Manchester City 1–0.

8 January 1980: Non-League Harlow Town beat Second Division promotion candidates Leicester City 1–0 in an FA Cup third round replay.

31 January 1980: Liverpool hold a two-point lead over Manchester United at the end of January. Arsenal are third, five points behind the leaders having played two games more.

29 February 1980: With the season approaching its final quarter, Manchester United have moved level on points at the top of the First Division with Liverpool, who have a game in hand. Unbeaten since the beginning of December, Ipswich Town have moved from third-bottom to third-top in less than three months, and are five points behind the leaders in third place. Arsenal and Southampton complete the top five. Bolton Wanderers remain bottom, with just one League win from their first 27 matches, and Derby County and Bristol City also remain in the relegation zone, with Everton occupying the last safe spot.

1 March 1980: Everton lose 2–1 at home to Liverpool in the First Division Merseyside derby, and during the game their legendary former striker Dixie Dean dies from a heart attack in the stands, aged 72. Manchester United's title hopes are dashed by a 6–0 thrashing at Ipswich Town.

8 March 1980: Second Division West Ham United beat Aston Villa 1–0 in the FA Cup sixth round. They are joined in the last four by Liverpool, Everton and holders Arsenal.

15 March 1980: Wolverhampton Wanderers beat Nottingham Forest, who have won the trophy in the last two seasons, 1–0 in the League Cup final thanks to a second-half goal from Andy Gray.

22 March 1980: United win the Manchester derby: Mickey Thomas scores the only goal of the game. Elsewhere in the top-flight, Derby County and Bristol City share six goals, Liverpool beat Brighton & Hove Albion and Nottingham Forest win at home to UEFA Cup hopefuls Southampton. The day's high scorers in the Football League are Third Division club Colchester United, who smash six past Brentford.

31 March 1980: Liverpool now have a four-point lead over Manchester United at the top of the First Division. Ipswich Town and Arsenal are the nearest challengers to the top two, and Southampton complete the top five. At the bottom of the table, Bolton Wanderers managed three League wins in March, but are still in bottom place, eight points adrift of safety. Derby County and Bristol City remain with them in the drop zone.

12 April 1980: Both FA Cup semi-finals - Arsenal versus Liverpool and Everton versus West Ham United - end in draws. Bolton Wanderers are relegated from the First Division.

16 April 1980: West Ham United beat Everton 2–1 at Elland Road to reach the FA Cup final. In the other semi-final replay, Arsenal and Liverpool draw again, 1–1.

23 April 1980: Nottingham Forest lose the second leg semi-final of their European Cup 1–0 to Ajax, but reach the final for the second year in succession with a 2–1 aggregate victory.

26 April 1980: Derby County, twice champions in the 1970s, are relegated from the First Division with one match remaining. Liverpool's goalless draw at Crystal Palace puts them on the verge of retaining the title.

28 April 1980: Arsenal and Liverpool require another replay after drawing 1–1 again in their FA Cup semi-final second replay at Villa Park.

29 April 1980: Bristol City lose 5–2 at Southampton to take the final First Division relegation spot.

30 April 1980: Liverpool are level on points with Manchester United at the end of April, with a superior goal difference and with two matches remaining to the Red Devils' one. Ipswich Town are third, five points behind.

1 May 1980: Arsenal finally reach the FA Cup final after beating Liverpool 1-0 in the FA Cup semi-final third replay at Highfield Road. Liverpool agree a fee of £300,000 for Chester striker Ian Rush, 18.

3 May 1980: Liverpool clinch the league title in their penultimate league game of the season by beating Aston Villa 4–1 at Anfield. The result is rendered academic by Manchester United's 2–0 defeat to Leeds United. Ipswich Town lose the unbeaten League run that they have maintained for over five months against Manchester City, but remain third. Leicester City beat Orient to clinch the Second Division title, and Birmingham City join them in promotion by drawing 3–3 with Notts County. In the Third Division, Kevin Drinkell fires three of Grimsby Town's four without reply at home to Sheffield United, which sees the Mariners crowned third-tier champions.

10 May 1980: Trevor Brooking scores the winning goal as Second Division West Ham United triumph 1–0 over holders Arsenal in the FA Cup final.

14 May 1980: Arsenal lose 5–4 in a penalty shoot-out to Valencia after a 0–0 draw in the European Cup Winners' Cup Final.

19 May 1980: More than two weeks after the planned final day of the season, the First Division fixtures are completed when Arsenal lose 5–0 to Middlesbrough. The result leaves Ipswich Town one point ahead of the Gunners in third place.

28 May 1980: Nottingham Forest retain the European Cup by beating Hamburg 1–0 in the final in Madrid. John Robertson scores the only goal in the first half.

13 June 1980: Clive Allen, 19, becomes the most expensive teenager in Europe when he joins Arsenal from Queens Park Rangers in a £1,250,000 deal.

== National teams ==
12 September 1979: England move closer to the 1980 European Championship Finals with a 1–0 win at home to Denmark.

17 October 1979: England virtually guarantee their place in the summer's European Championship Finals by beating Northern Ireland 5–1 at Windsor Park.

22 November 1979: Glenn Hoddle scores on his debut for England in a 2–0 over Bulgaria in a European Championship qualifier.

13 May 1980: England beat world champions Argentina 3–1 in a friendly at Wembley with two goals from David Johnson and one from Kevin Keegan.

17 May 1980: England's run of six consecutive wins ends abruptly in a 4–1 defeat to Wales in the Home Championship.

24 May 1980: England beat Scotland 2–0 at Hampden Park but finish runners-up to Northern Ireland in the Home Championship.

12 June 1980: England's first match at the European Championship Finals for twelve years ends in a 1–1 draw against Belgium. The game is marred by hooliganism in the stands that is only calmed by the use of tear gas by the Italian police.

15 June 1980: England are eliminated from the European Championships after they lose 1–0 to hosts Italy through a late goal from Marco Tardelli.

18 June 1980: England win their final group match at the European Championships 2–1 against Spain, but finish in third place in the group.

== UEFA competitions ==
Brian Clough's Nottingham Forest made up for disappointment in the League by retaining the European Cup and becoming the first team to have won more European Cups than league championships. Arsenal faced Valencia of Spain in the European Cup Winners' Cup final, days after their FA Cup final loss. It finished goalless after extra time, and Arsenal lost the penalty shoot-out after misses from Liam Brady and Graham Rix.

== FA Cup ==
Second Division West Ham United, managed by John Lyall, won the FA Cup, beating Arsenal 1–0 with a Trevor Brooking goal. They are the last team to win the FA Cup from outside the top division.

== League Cup ==
Wolverhampton Wanderers overcame the challenge of European champions Nottingham Forest to lift their second League Cup. The match finished 1–0 with a goal by Andy Gray following a mix-up between goalkeeper Peter Shilton and defender David Needham.

== Football League ==
=== First Division ===
Bob Paisley's Liverpool retained their league championship trophy after fighting off a determined challenge by Dave Sexton's Manchester United. Nottingham Forest failed to make a serious title challenge but compensated for this by retaining the European Cup.

Bristol City and Bolton Wanderers were relegated after brief and uneventful spells in the First Division, but Derby County's relegation came just five years after they had been league champions.

Kevin Keegan, the current European Footballer of the Year, ended his three-year spell with Hamburg in Germany and returned to England in a shock £400,000 move to Southampton.

Much of the attention in the early part of the season focused on Manchester City where Malcolm Allison had dismantled the side selling international talents such as Asa Hartford and Peter Barnes and replacing them with unknowns and the uncapped Steve Daley for £1.5 million. City had a mediocre season including an FA Cup defeat by Fourth Division Halifax Town.

Pos	Team	Pld	W	D	L	GF	GA	GD	Pts	Qualification or relegation
1	Liverpool (C)	42	25	10	7	81	30	+51	60	Qualification for the European Cup first round
2	Manchester United	42	24	10	8	65	35	+30	58	Qualification for the UEFA Cup first round
3	Ipswich Town	42	22	9	11	68	39	+29	53	Qualification for the UEFA Cup first round
4	Arsenal	42	18	16	8	52	36	+16	52	
5	Nottingham Forest	42	20	8	14	63	43	+20	48	Qualification for the European Cup first round (Note: Nottingham Forest qualified for the European Cup first round as the 1979–80 European Cup winners.)
6	Wolverhampton Wanderers	42	19	9	14	58	47	+11	47	Qualification for the UEFA Cup first round (Note: Wolverhampton Wanderers qualified for the UEFA Cup as the 1979–80 Football League Cup winners.)
7	Aston Villa	42	16	14	12	51	50	+1	46	
8	Southampton	42	18	9	15	65	53	+12	45	
9	Middlesbrough	42	16	12	14	50	44	+6	44	
10	West Bromwich Albion	42	11	19	12	54	50	+4	41	
11	Leeds United	42	13	14	15	46	50	−4	40	
12	Norwich City	42	13	14	15	58	66	−8	40	
13	Crystal Palace	42	12	16	14	41	50	−9	40	
14	Tottenham Hotspur	42	15	10	17	52	62	−10	40	
15	Coventry City	42	16	7	19	56	66	−10	39	
16	Brighton & Hove Albion	42	11	15	16	47	57	−10	37	
17	Manchester City	42	12	13	17	43	66	−23	37	
18	Stoke City	42	13	10	19	44	58	−14	36	
19	Everton	42	9	17	16	43	51	−8	35	
20	Bristol City (R)	42	9	13	20	37	66	−29	31	Relegation to the Second Division
21	Derby County (R)	42	11	8	23	47	67	−20	30	Relegation to the Second Division
22	Bolton Wanderers (R)	42	5	15	22	38	73	−35	25	Relegation to the Second Division

Source: World Football
Rules for classification: 1) Points; 2) Goal difference; 3) Goals scored
(C) Champions; (R) Relegated

=== Second Division ===
Leicester City, Sunderland and Birmingham City ended their relatively short spells in the Second Division and occupied the division's three promotion places. Going down were Fulham, Burnley and Charlton Athletic.

Pos	Team	Pld	W	D	L	GF	GA	GD	Pts	Qualification or relegation
1	Leicester City (C, P)	42	21	13	8	58	38	+20	55	Promotion to the First Division
2	Sunderland (P)	42	21	12	9	69	42	+27	54	Promotion to the First Division
3	Birmingham City (P)	42	21	11	10	58	38	+20	53	Promotion to the First Division
4	Chelsea	42	23	7	12	66	52	+14	53	
5	Queens Park Rangers	42	18	13	11	75	53	+22	49	
6	Luton Town	42	16	17	9	66	45	+21	49	
7	West Ham United	42	20	7	15	54	43	+11	47	Qualification for the Cup Winners' Cup first round (Note: West Ham United qualified for the Cup Winners' Cup first round as the 1979–80 FA Cup winners.)
8	Cambridge United	42	14	16	12	61	53	+8	44	
9	Newcastle United	42	15	14	13	53	49	+4	44	
10	Preston North End	42	12	19	11	56	52	+4	43	
11	Oldham Athletic	42	16	11	15	49	53	−4	43	
12	Swansea City	42	17	9	16	48	53	−5	43	
13	Shrewsbury Town	42	18	5	19	60	53	+7	41	
14	Orient	42	12	17	13	48	54	−6	41	
15	Cardiff City	42	16	8	18	41	48	−7	40	
16	Wrexham	42	16	6	20	40	49	−9	38	
17	Notts County	42	11	15	16	51	52	−1	37	
18	Watford	42	12	13	17	39	46	−7	37	
19	Bristol Rovers	42	11	13	18	50	64	−14	35	
20	Fulham (R)	42	11	7	24	42	74	−32	29	Relegation to the Third Division
21	Burnley (R)	42	6	15	21	39	73	−34	27	Relegation to the Third Division
22	Charlton Athletic (R)	42	6	10	26	39	78	−39	22	Relegation to the Third Division

Rules for classification: 1) Points; 2) Goal difference; 3) Goals scored
(C) Champions; (P) Promoted; (R) Relegated

=== Third Division ===
Grimsby Town, Blackburn Rovers and Sheffield Wednesday all achieved some long-awaited success by gaining promotion from the Third Division. Bury, Southend United, Mansfield Town and Wimbledon occupied the Third Division's relegation places.

Pos	Team	Pld	W	D	L	GF	GA	GD	Pts	Promotion or relegation
1	Grimsby Town (C, P)	46	26	10	10	73	42	+31	62	Promotion to the Second Division
2	Blackburn Rovers (P)	46	25	9	12	58	36	+22	59	Promotion to the Second Division
3	Sheffield Wednesday (P)	46	21	16	9	81	47	+34	58	Promotion to the Second Division
4	Chesterfield	46	23	11	12	71	46	+25	57	
5	Colchester United	46	20	12	14	64	56	+8	52	
6	Carlisle United	46	18	12	16	66	56	+10	48	
7	Reading	46	16	16	14	66	65	+1	48	
8	Exeter City	46	19	10	17	60	68	−8	48	
9	Chester	46	17	13	16	49	57	−8	47	
10	Swindon Town	46	19	8	19	71	63	+8	46	
11	Barnsley	46	16	14	16	53	56	−3	46	
12	Sheffield United	46	18	10	18	60	66	−6	46	
13	Rotherham United	46	18	10	18	58	66	−8	46	
14	Millwall	46	16	13	17	65	59	+6	45	
15	Plymouth Argyle	46	16	12	18	59	55	+4	44	
16	Gillingham	46	14	14	18	49	51	−2	42	
17	Oxford United	46	14	13	19	57	62	−5	41	
18	Blackpool	46	15	11	20	62	74	−12	41	
19	Brentford	46	15	11	20	59	73	−14	41	
20	Hull City	46	12	16	18	51	69	−18	40	
21	Bury (R)	46	16	7	23	45	59	−14	39	Relegation to the Fourth Division
22	Southend United (R)	46	14	10	22	47	58	−11	38	Relegation to the Fourth Division
23	Mansfield Town (R)	46	10	16	20	47	58	−11	36	Relegation to the Fourth Division
24	Wimbledon (R)	46	10	14	22	52	81	−29	34	Relegation to the Fourth Division

Source: rsssf.com
(C) Champions; (P) Promoted; (R) Relegated

=== Fourth Division ===
Huddersfield Town and Portsmouth finally achieved some success by gaining promotion from the Fourth Division. Newport County achieved their first promotion since 1939 and Walsall were also promoted. Rochdale finished bottom but survived re-election by one vote ahead of Altrincham.

Pos	Team	Pld	W	D	L	GF	GA	GD	Pts	Promotion
1	Huddersfield Town (C, P)	46	27	12	7	101	48	+53	66	Promotion to the Third Division
2	Walsall (P)	46	23	18	5	75	47	+28	64	Promotion to the Third Division
3	Newport County (P)	46	27	7	12	83	50	+33	61	Cup Winners' Cup first round and promotion to the Third Division
4	Portsmouth (P)	46	24	12	10	91	49	+42	60	Promotion to the Third Division
5	Bradford City	46	24	12	10	77	50	+27	60	
6	Wigan Athletic	46	21	13	12	76	61	+15	55	
7	Lincoln City	46	18	17	11	64	42	+22	53	
8	Peterborough United	46	21	10	15	58	47	+11	52	
9	Torquay United	46	15	17	14	70	69	+1	47	
10	Aldershot	46	16	13	17	62	53	+9	45	
11	Bournemouth	46	13	18	15	52	51	+1	44	
12	Doncaster Rovers	46	15	14	17	62	63	−1	44	
13	Northampton Town	46	16	12	18	51	66	−15	44	
14	Scunthorpe United	46	14	15	17	58	75	−17	43	
15	Tranmere Rovers	46	14	13	19	50	56	−6	41	
16	Stockport County	46	14	12	20	48	72	−24	40	
17	York City	46	14	11	21	65	82	−17	39	
18	Halifax Town	46	13	13	20	46	72	−26	39	
19	Hartlepool United	46	14	10	22	59	64	−5	38	
20	Port Vale	46	12	12	22	56	70	−14	36	
21	Hereford United	46	11	14	21	38	52	−14	36	Re-elected
22	Darlington	46	9	17	20	50	74	−24	35	Re-elected
23	Crewe Alexandra	46	11	13	22	35	68	−33	35	Re-elected
24	Rochdale	46	7	13	26	33	79	−46	27	Re-elected

(C) Champions; (P) Promoted

=== Top goalscorers ===
First Division

- Phil Boyer (Southampton) – 23 goals

Second Division

- Clive Allen (Queens Park Rangers) – 28 goals

Third Division

- Terry Curran (Sheffield Wednesday) – 22 goals

Fourth Division

- Colin Garwood (Portsmouth and Aldershot) – 27 goals

== Non-league football ==
The divisional champions of the major non-League competitions were:

Competition	Winners
Alliance Premier League	Altrincham
Isthmian League	Enfield
Northern Premier League	Mossley
Southern League	Midland Division – Bridgend Town; Southern Division – Dorchester Town
FA Trophy	Dagenham
FA Vase	Stamford

== Awards ==
Liverpool's Terry McDermott was voted PFA Players' Player of the Year and FWA Footballer of the Year. PFA Young Player of the Year was Tottenham Hotspur's midfielder Glenn Hoddle.

== Star managers ==
- Bob Paisley yielded another league title triumph for Liverpool.
- Brian Clough retained the European Cup for Nottingham Forest.
- John Barnwell took Wolverhampton Wanderers to victory in the League Cup.
- John Lyall won the FA Cup for Second Division West Ham United for the second time in five years.
- Dave Sexton came close to ending Manchester United's long wait for a league title.
- Jock Wallace achieved promotion to the First Division with Second Division champions Leicester City.
- Jim Smith's success in the Second Division with promoted Birmingham City ensured that four of the five West Midlands clubs would be playing top-flight football apart from Walsall in 1980–81.
- Bobby Robson took Ipswich Town into the UEFA Cup after they finished third in the league.
- Terry Neill took Arsenal to the runners-up spot in both the European Cup Winners' Cup and the FA Cup.
- Howard Kendall won promotion to the Second Division with Blackburn Rovers.
- Len Ashurst clinched Newport County's first promotion for 41 years.

== Famous debutants ==
18 August 1979: Tommy Caton, 16-year-old defender, makes his debut for First Division side Manchester City on the opening day of the season in a goalless home draw with newly promoted Crystal Palace, just weeks after leaving school.

15 September 1979: Gary Stevens, 17-year-old defender, makes his debut for First Division side Brighton and Hove Albion in a 2-0 win over Ipswich Town, at the Goldstone Ground

29 September 1979: Danny Thomas, 17-year-old defender, makes his debut as a substitute for First Division side Coventry City in a 1-1 draw with Tottenham Hotspur, at Highfield Road

12 March 1980: Kevin Ratcliffe, 19-year-old defender, makes his First Division debut for Everton in a 0-0 draw with Manchester United at Old Trafford.

22 March 1980: Paul Bracewell, 17-year-old midfielder, makes his First Division debut as a substitute for Stoke City in a 0-3 defeat to Wolverhampton Wanderers at Molineux.

7 April 1980: Paul Davis, 18-year-old midfielder, makes his First Division debut for Arsenal in a 2–1 win over local rivals Tottenham Hotspur at White Hart Lane.

== Deaths ==
- 20 August 1979 - Stan Fox, 73, played 136 league games at half-back and full-back for York City in the 1930s.
- 26 August 1979 – Sam Lawrie, 44, former Middlesbrough and Charlton Athletic winger.
- 11 September 1979 - Laurie Banfield, 89, played 259 league games for Bristol City between 1911 and 1925 as a left-back, his career disrupted by World War I.
- c. 24 January 1980 – Terry Anderson, 35, former Norwich City winger who helped the club reach the First Division for the first time in 1972. He was found drowned on 31 January after going missing a week earlier.
- 1 March 1980 – Dixie Dean, 73, legendary Everton striker who scored 60 league goals in the 1927–28 season; died on 1 March after suffering a heart attack while watching Everton's game against Liverpool at Goodison Park.
- 4 March 1980 - Eric Kerfoot, 55, spent most of his professional career with Leeds United, played 349 games at left-half between 1949 and 1959.
- 24 April 1980 - Johnny McIlwaine, 75, played in defence and attack during the 1920s and 1930s, starting in his native Scotland with Falkirk before moving south of the border to Portsmouth in 1928, later having two spells with Southampton and a spell in Wales with Llanelli. He also served Southampton and Grimsby Town as assistant manager after retiring as a player.
