= 1976–77 Wolverhampton Wanderers F.C. season =

English football club season

Wolverhampton Wanderers
1976–77 season
- Chairman: John Ireland
- Manager: Sammy Chung
- Stadium: Molineux
- Football League Second Division: 1st (promoted)
- League Cup: Second round
- FA Cup: Sixth round
- Top goalscorer: League: Kenny Hibbitt (17); All: John Richards (20)
- Highest home attendance: 49,770 v Leeds United (FA Cup, 19 March 1977)
- Lowest home attendance: 15,563 v Carlisle United (Division Two, 23 October 1976)
- Average home league attendance: 21,226
- Biggest win: 6–1 v Hereford United (A), Division Two, 2 October 1976
- Biggest defeat: 2–6 v Southampton (H), Division Two, 5 October 1976

The 1976–77 season was the 78th of competitive league football in the history of Wolverhampton Wanderers. They finished as champions of the Second Division to make an immediate return to the First Division following relegation the previous season.

== Squad ==
Substitute appearances indicated in brackets

Pos.	Nat.	Name	League		League Cup		FA Cup		Total	
Pos.	Nat.	Name	Apps	Goals	Apps	Goals	Apps	Goals	Apps	Goals
GK	ENG	Phil Parkes	0	0	0	0	0	0	0	0
GK	ENG	Gary Pierce	42	0	1	0	5	0	48	0
DF	WAL	George Berry	1	0	0	0	0	0	1	0
DF	ENG	Colin Brazier	2	0	0	0	1	0	3	0
DF	IRE	Maurice Daly	0	0	0	0	0	0	0	0
DF	JAM	Bob Hazell	0	0	0	0	0	0	0	0
DF	ENG	John McAlle	39	0	1	0	5	0	45	0
DF	SCO	Frank Munro	33	1	0	0	4	0	37	1
DF	ENG	Geoff Palmer	42	1	1	0	5	0	48	1
DF	ENG	Derek Parkin	42	0	1	1	5	0	48	1
MF	ENG	Mike Bailey	10(1)	0	1	0	0	0	11(1)	0
MF	SCO	John Black	0	0	0	0	0	0	0	0
MF	SCO	Willie Carr	32	4	1	0	4(1)	0	37(2)	4
MF	ENG	Steve Daley	42	13	1	0	5	1	48	14
MF	ENG	John Farley	0	0	0	0	0	0	0	0
MF	ENG	Kenny Hibbitt	40(1)	17	1	0	5	1	46(1)	18
MF	NIR	Jimmy Kelly	2(1)	0	0	0	0	0	2(1)	0
MF	ENG	Paul Moss	0	0	0	0	0	0	0	0
MF	ENG	Gerry O'Hara	2(1)	0	0	0	0	0	2(1)	0
MF	ENG	Martin Patching	26(5)	2	0	0	4	0	30(5)	2
MF	ENG	Kenny Todd	3(1)	1	0	0	0	0	3(1)	1
FW	ENG	Norman Bell	0	0	0	0	0	0	0	0
FW	ENG	Mel Eves	0	0	0	0	0	0	0	0
FW	ENG	Bobby Gould	11(6)	10	1	0	0(1)	0	12(7)	10
FW	ENG	Steve Kindon	25(3)	4	1	0	2(2)	0	28(5)	4
FW	ENG	John Richards	27	15	0	0	5	5	32	20
FW	ENG	Alan Sunderland	41	16	1	0	5	0	47	16
FW	NIR	Sammy Wright	0	0	0	0	0	0	0	0

== Second Division ==
Pos	Team	Pld	W	D	L	GF	GA	GD	Pts	Qualification or relegation
1	Wolverhampton Wanderers (C, P)	42	22	13	7	84	45	+39	57	Promotion to the First Division
2	Chelsea (P)	42	21	13	8	73	53	+20	55	Promotion to the First Division
3	Nottingham Forest (P)	42	21	10	11	77	43	+34	52	Promotion to the First Division
4	Bolton Wanderers	42	20	11	11	75	54	+21	51	
5	Blackpool	42	17	17	8	58	42	+16	51	

Rules for classification: 1) Points; 2) Goal difference; 3) Goals scored
(C) Champions; (P) Promoted

== Results ==
=== Second Division ===
21 August 1976 1	Wolverhampton Wanderers	0–0	Burnley	Wolverhampton
				Stadium: Molineux; Attendance: 19,480

24 August 1976 2	Sheffield United	2–2	Wolverhampton Wanderers	Sheffield
	Edwards 81'; Hamilton 82'		Carr 22'; Sunderland 77'	Stadium: Bramall Lane; Attendance: 15,848

28 August 1976 3	Nottingham Forest	1–3	Wolverhampton Wanderers	West Bridgford
	Daley 20' (o.g.)		Gould 14', 73'; Daley 16'	Stadium: City Ground; Attendance: 17,222

4 September 1976 4	Wolverhampton Wanderers	3–0	Charlton Athletic	Wolverhampton
	Gould 69', 85'; Sunderland 87'			Stadium: Molineux; Attendance: 15,652

11 September 1976 5	Fulham	0–0	Wolverhampton Wanderers	London
				Stadium: Craven Cottage; Attendance: 25,794

18 September 1976 6	Wolverhampton Wanderers	5–0	Charlton Athletic	Wolverhampton
	Sunderland 21'; Daley 27'; Kindon 31', 81'; Hibbitt 43'			Stadium: Molineux; Attendance: 19,126

25 September 1976 7	Wolverhampton Wanderers	1–2	Luton Town	Wolverhampton
	Hibbitt 51'		Husband 29'; Deans 65'	Stadium: Molineux; Attendance: 19,826

2 October 1976 8	Hereford United	1–6	Wolverhampton Wanderers	Hereford
	McNeil 53' (pen.)		Sunderland 6'; Kindon 28'; Gould 42', 67'; Carr 61'; Daley 83'	Stadium: Edgar Street; Attendance: 13,891

5 October 1976 9	Wolverhampton Wanderers	2–6	Southampton	Wolverhampton
	Hibbitt 49' (pen.); Daley 88'		Holmes 4', 79'; Channon 44', 89'; McCalliog 48'; Earles 56'	Stadium: Molineux; Attendance: 21,286

16 October 1976 10	Hull City	2–0	Wolverhampton Wanderers	Hull
	Hawley 50', 85'			Stadium: Boothferry Park; Attendance: 12,015

23 October 1976 11	Wolverhampton Wanderers	4–0	Carlisle United	Wolverhampton
	Sunderland 23', 87', 88'; Carr 38'			Stadium: Molineux; Attendance: 15,563

30 October 1976 12	Blackpool	2–2	Wolverhampton Wanderers	Blackpool
	Kindon 5' (o.g.); Hart 32'		Hibbitt 3'; Munro 67'	Stadium: Bloomfield Road; Attendance: 21,005

6 November 1976 13	Wolverhampton Wanderers	3–1	Millwall	Wolverhampton
	Kitchener 4' (o.g.); Sunderland 8'; Daley 25'		Brisley 24'	Stadium: Molineux; Attendance: 17,121

13 November 1976 14	Notts County	1–1	Wolverhampton Wanderers	Nottingham
	Bradd 74'		Gould 89'	Stadium: Meadow Lane; Attendance: 14,234

20 November 1976 15	Wolverhampton Wanderers	1–2	Blackburn Rovers	Wolverhampton
	Sunderland 22'		Byrom 14', 67'	Stadium: Molineux; Attendance: 19,302

27 November 1976 16	Orient	2–4	Wolverhampton Wanderers	London
	Queen 29' (pen.); Cunningham 51'		Richards 10', 21', 89' (pen.); Gould 59'	Stadium: Brisbane Road; Attendance: 6,888

4 December 1976 17	Wolverhampton Wanderers	4–0	Plymouth Argyle	Wolverhampton
	Richards 30', 84'; Sunderland 44'; Hibbitt 69'			Stadium: Molineux; Attendance: 16,370

11 December 1976 18	Chelsea	3–3	Wolverhampton Wanderers	London
	R. Wilkins 18'; Britton 80'; Finnieston 87'		Richards 16', 71'; Gould 38'	Stadium: Stamford Bridge; Attendance: 36,137

18 December 1976 19	Wolverhampton Wanderers	1–0	Bolton Wanderers	Wolverhampton
	Gould 77'			Stadium: Molineux; Attendance: 18,444

27 December 1976 20	Bristol Rovers	1–5	Wolverhampton Wanderers	Bristol
	Williams 49'		Sunderland 10', 14'; Eadie 25' (o.g.); Kindon 48'; Daley 87'	Stadium: Eastville; Attendance: 20,660

1 January 1977 21	Millwall	1–1	Wolverhampton Wanderers	London
	Lee 73'		Hibbitt 45'	Stadium: The Den; Attendance: 16,928

22 January 1977 22	Burnley	0–0	Wolverhampton Wanderers	Burnley
				Stadium: Turf Moor; Attendance: 13,602

5 February 1977 23	Wolverhampton Wanderers	2–1	Nottingham Forest	Wolverhampton
	Carr 32'; Lloyd 36' (o.g.)		Chapman 90'	Stadium: Molineux; Attendance: 30,661

9 February 1977 24	Wolverhampton Wanderers	2–1	Sheffield United	Wolverhampton
	Sunderland 18'; Richards 20'		McAlle 37' (o.g.)	Stadium: Molineux; Attendance: 20,429

12 February 1977 25	Charlton Athletic	1–1	Wolverhampton Wanderers	London
	McAuley 62'		Patching 81'	Stadium: The Valley; Attendance: 17,055

19 February 1977 26	Wolverhampton Wanderers	5–1	Fulham	Wolverhampton
	Richards 37'; Daley 46', 86'; Hibbitt 57' (pen.), 88'		Mitchell 48'	Stadium: Molineux; Attendance: 25,865

1 March 1977 27	Wolverhampton Wanderers	2–1	Blackpool	Wolverhampton
	Daley 15'; Hibbitt 86'		Hatton 65'	Stadium: Molineux; Attendance: 23,879

5 March 1977 28	Luton Town	2–0	Wolverhampton Wanderers	Luton
	Husband 35'; Fuccillo 36'			Stadium: Kenilworth Road; Attendance: 19,200

12 March 1977 29	Wolverhampton Wanderers	2–1	Hereford United	Wolverhampton
	Todd 39'; Hibbitt 49'		Briley 77'	Stadium: Molineux; Attendance: 22,992

15 March 1977 30	Oldham Athletic	0–2	Wolverhampton Wanderers	Oldham
			Sunderland 55'; Daley 81'	Stadium: Boundary Park; Attendance: 11,808

26 March 1977 31	Wolverhampton Wanderers	2–1	Hull City	Wolverhampton
	Richards 62'; Hibbitt 73'		Hemmerman 74'	Stadium: Molineux; Attendance: 19,598

5 April 1977 32	Wolverhampton Wanderers	1–0	Bristol Rovers	Wolverhampton
	Daley 28'			Stadium: Molineux; Attendance: 19,149

9 April 1977 33	Cardiff City	2–2	Wolverhampton Wanderers	Cardiff
	Sayer 87'; Went 90'		Daley 50'; Hibbitt 68'	Stadium: Ninian Park; Attendance: 15,445

11 April 1977 34	Wolverhampton Wanderers	2–2	Notts County	Wolverhampton
	Daley 30'; Richards 32'		Bradd 41'; Mann 46'	Stadium: Molineux; Attendance: 25,549

16 April 1977 35	Blackburn Rovers	0–2	Wolverhampton Wanderers	Blackburn
			Hibbitt 57' (pen.); Richards 74'	Stadium: Ewood Park; Attendance: 11,291

19 April 1977 36	Carlisle United	2–1	Wolverhampton Wanderers	Carlisle
	Rafferty 7'; O'Neill 86'		Hibbitt 30'	Stadium: Brunton Park; Attendance: 8,533

23 April 1977 37	Wolverhampton Wanderers	1–0	Orient	Wolverhampton
	Richards 84'			Stadium: Molineux; Attendance: 19,877

26 April 1977 38	Wolverhampton Wanderers	4–1	Cardiff City	Wolverhampton
	Palmer 58'; Sunderland 71'; Patching 88'; Hibbitt 90'		Sayer 80'	Stadium: Molineux; Attendance: 21,234

30 April 1977 39	Plymouth Argyle	0–0	Wolverhampton Wanderers	Plymouth
				Stadium: Home Park; Attendance: 16,794

3 May 1977 40	Southampton	1–0	Wolverhampton Wanderers	Southampton
	Holmes 36'			Stadium: The Dell; Attendance: 20,216

7 May 1977 41	Wolverhampton Wanderers	1–1	Chelsea	Wolverhampton
	Richards 78'		Langley 16'	Stadium: Molineux; Attendance: 33,465

14 May 1977 42	Bolton Wanderers	0–1	Wolverhampton Wanderers	Bolton
			Hibbitt 20'	Stadium: Burnden Park; Attendance: 35,603

=== League Cup ===
31 August 1976 2nd Round	Wolverhampton Wanderers	1–2	Sheffield Wednesday	Wolverhampton
	Parkin 73'		Potts 4'; Wylde 82'	Stadium: Molineux; Attendance: 15,823

=== FA Cup ===
8 January 1977 3rd Round	Wolverhampton Wanderers	3–2	Rotherham United	Wolverhampton
	Daley 11'; Richards 31', 74'		Crawford 28', 62' (pen.)	Stadium: Molineux; Attendance: 23,605

29 January 1977 4th Round	Ipswich Town	2–2	Wolverhampton Wanderers	Ipswich
	Mariner 75'; Burley 90'		Richards 31', 87'	Stadium: Portman Road; Attendance: 32,996

2 February 1977 4th Round Replay	Wolverhampton Wanderers	1–0	Ipswich Town	Wolverhampton
	Richards 22'			Stadium: Molineux; Attendance: 33,686

29 February 1977 5th Round	Wolverhampton Wanderers	1–0	Chester	Wolverhampton
	Hibbitt 81'			Stadium: Molineux; Attendance: 37,803

19 March 1977 6th Round	Wolverhampton Wanderers	0–1	Leeds United	Wolverhampton
			E. Gray 31'	Stadium: Molineux; Attendance: 49,770
