= Malcolm Bailey (footballer, born 1950) =

English footballer

Personal information
- Full name: Malcolm Roy Bailey
- Date of birth: 14 April 1950
- Place of birth: Biddulph, England
- Date of death: 14 November 2017 (aged 67)
- Positions: Centre-half; right-half

Youth career
- Port Vale

Senior career*
Years	Team	Apps	(Gls)
1967–1970	Port Vale	2	(0)
1970–197?	Northwich Victoria		
197?–1977	Runcorn		
1977–1983	Altrincham	174	(9)
1983–1984	Telford United		
1984	Hyde United	18	(0)
- * Club domestic league appearances and goals

Malcolm Roy Bailey (14 April 1950 – 14 November 2017) was an English footballer who played as a centre-half.

Bailey failed to establish himself in the Football League with Port Vale, and so went into non-League football with Northwich Victoria and Runcorn in the 1970s. He played for Altrincham between 1977 and 1983, where he won two Alliance Premier League titles and Cheshire Senior Cup and FA Trophy titles. He later played for Telford United and Hyde United.

== Career ==
=== Early career ===
Born in Biddulph, Bailey graduated through the Port Vale youth side to sign as a professional in May 1967. His Fourth Division debut came on 21 April 1969, in a 1–0 home win over Grimsby Town. He was only to play once more however, before being given a free transfer in May 1970. He moved on to Northwich Victoria of the Northern Premier League, and then switched to league rivals Runcorn.

=== Altrincham ===
Bailey signed with Altrincham, also of the Northern Premier League, for the 1977–78 season, and formed a partnership with John Owens. In his first season, he scored the winning goal against former club Runcorn that booked "Alty" a place in the 1978 FA Trophy final. In the final, Altrincham beat Leatherhead 3–1. The following season the club finished second in the Northern Premier League, and Bailey played in the FA Cup against Tottenham Hotspur at White Hart Lane, but missed the replay due to injury. In the 1979–80 campaign he helped the club to claim the inaugural Alliance Premier League title and the third round of the FA Cup. The following season he picked up his second championship medal, though he began to miss an increasing number of games due to injury. The next season he helped the club to reach the 1982 FA Trophy final and to lift the Cheshire Senior Cup. He struggled with injury at Moss Lane, though still managed to make 262 appearances for the club, scoring 20 goals.

=== Later career ===
Bailey signed with Telford United, also of the Alliance Premier League, for the 1983–84 campaign. He signed for Hyde United in 1984, making his debut in a 4–1 win over Southport. He spent just half a season with the club, making 21 appearances in all competitions.

== Personal life ==
In addition to his footballing career, Bailey worked in the engineering trade. His son, Michael (born 1985), also played for Altrincham.

== Career statistics ==
Appearances and goals by club, season and competition
Club	Season	League			FA Cup		Other		Total	
Club	Season	Division	Apps	Goals	Apps	Goals	Apps	Goals	Apps	Goals
Port Vale	1968–69	Fourth Division	2	0	0	0	0	0	2	0
Altrincham	1977–78	Northern Premier League	37	1	1	1	18	2	56	4
Altrincham	1978–79	Northern Premier League	31	2	3	1	10	1	44	4
Altrincham	1979–80	Alliance Premier League	32	1	4	1	12	2	48	4
Altrincham	1980–81	Alliance Premier League	28	1	4	0	10	1	42	2
Altrincham	1981–82	Alliance Premier League	18	1	1	0	12	1	31	2
Altrincham	1982–83	Alliance Premier League	26	3	2	0	7	0	35	3
Altrincham	1983–84	Alliance Premier League	2	0	0	0	2	1	4	1
Altrincham	Total		174	9	15	3	71	8	260	20
Hyde United	1984–85	Northern Premier League	18	0	2	0	1	0	21	0

== Honours ==
Altrincham

- FA Trophy: 1978; runner-up: 1982
- Alliance Premier League: 1979–80 & 1980–81
- Conference League Cup runner-up: 1980
- Cheshire Senior Cup: 1982
