= 1978–79 Welsh Cup =

Tournament details
- Country: Wales

Final positions
- Champions: (England) Shrewsbury Town
- Runners-up: (Wales) Wrexham

The 1978–79 FAW Welsh Cup is the 92nd season of the annual knockout tournament for competitive football teams in Wales.

== Key ==
League name pointed after clubs name.

- CCL - Cheshire County League
- FL D2 - Football League Second Division
- FL D3 - Football League Third Division
- FL D4 - Football League Fourth Division
- NPL - Northern Premier League
- SFL - Southern Football League
- WLN - Welsh League North
- WLS - Welsh League South

== Fourth round ==
Nine winners from the Third round and seven new clubs.

Tie no	Home	Score	Away
1	Chester (FL D3)	0–0	Bangor City (NPL)
replay	Bangor City (NPL)	0–1	Chester (FL D3)

== Fifth round ==
Tie no	Home	Score	Away
1	Chester (FL D3)	4–3	Oswestry Town (SFL)

== Semifinal ==
Tie no	Home	Score	Away
1	Shrewsbury Town (FL D3)	2–0	Worcester City (SFL)
2	Chester (FL D3)	0–1	Wrexham (FL D2)

== Final ==
Tie no	Home	Score	Away
1	Wrexham (FL D2)	1–1	Shrewsbury Town (FL D3)
1	Shrewsbury Town (FL D3)	1–0	Wrexham (FL D2)
