= 1979–80 Northern Premier League =

Northern Premier League
- Season: 1979–80
- Champions: Mossley
- Promoted: Frickley Athletic
- Relegated: none
- Matches: 462
- Goals: 1,350 (2.92 per match)
- Biggest home win: Burton Albion 8–0 Gateshead (22 September 1979); Matlock Town 8–0 Southport (30 April 1980)
- Biggest away win: Workington 0–5 Grantham (1 September 1979); Southport 2–7 Mossley (10 November 1979)
- Highest scoring: Southport 2–7 Mossley (10 November 1979); Gainsborough Trinity 4–5 Netherfield (8 December 1978)
- Longest winning run: 10 matches Burton Albion (22 September 1979 – 26 December 1979)
- Longest unbeaten run: 22 matches Mossley (5 January 1980 – 3 May 1980)
- Longest winless run: 16 matches Runcorn (25 September 1979 – 2 February 1980)
- Longest losing run: 6 matches Gateshead (11 November 1978 – 16 December 1978); Tamworth (13 October 1979 – 17 November 1979)

The 1979–80 Northern Premier League was the twelfth season of the Northern Premier League, a regional football league in Northern England, the northern areas of the Midlands and North Wales. The season began on 18 August 1979 and concluded on 7 May 1980.

== Overview ==
The League featured twenty-two clubs.

=== Team changes ===
The Alliance Premier League was established as a new, national top division of non-League football. Seven Northern Premier League clubs and thirteen clubs from the Premier Division of the Southern League joined the newly created Alliance Premier League. The remaining clubs in the Northern Premier League had effectively been relegated down one tier in the English football league system.

The following seven clubs left the League at the end of the previous season:

- Altrincham promoted to Alliance Premier League
- Bangor City promoted to Alliance Premier League
- Barrow promoted to Alliance Premier League
- Boston United promoted to Alliance Premier League
- Northwich Victoria promoted to Alliance Premier League
- Scarborough promoted to Alliance Premier League
- Stafford Rangers promoted to Alliance Premier League

The following six clubs joined the League at the start of the season:

- Burton Albion promoted from Southern League Division One North
- Grantham promoted from Southern League Division One North
- Marine promoted from Cheshire County League Division One
- Oswestry Town promoted from Southern League Division One North
- Tamworth promoted from Southern League Division One North
- Witton Albion promoted from Cheshire County League Division One

=== League table ===
Pos	Team	Pld	W	D	L	GF	GA	GD	Pts	Qualification or relegation
1	Mossley (C)	42	28	9	5	96	41	+55	65	
2	Witton Albion	42	28	8	6	89	30	+59	64	
3	Frickley Athletic (P)	42	24	13	5	93	48	+45	61	Promoted to Alliance Premier League
4	Burton Albion	42	25	6	11	83	42	+41	56	
5	Matlock Town	42	18	17	7	87	53	+34	53	
6	Buxton	42	21	9	12	61	48	+13	51	
7	Worksop Town	42	20	10	12	65	52	+13	50	
8	Macclesfield Town	42	18	11	13	67	53	+14	47	
9	Grantham	42	18	8	16	71	65	+6	44	
10	Marine	42	16	10	16	65	57	+8	42	
11	Goole Town	42	14	13	15	61	63	−2	41	
12	Lancaster City	42	13	13	16	74	77	−3	39	
13	Oswestry Town	42	12	14	16	44	60	−16	38	
14	Gainsborough Trinity	42	14	8	20	64	75	−11	36	
15	Runcorn	42	11	11	20	46	63	−17	33	
16	Gateshead	42	11	11	20	50	77	−27	33	
17	Morecambe	42	10	12	20	40	59	−19	32	
18	Netherfield	42	7	15	20	37	66	−29	29	
19	Southport	42	8	13	21	30	75	−45	29	
20	South Liverpool	42	7	14	21	51	84	−33	28	
21	Workington	42	8	12	22	50	85	−35	28	
22	Tamworth	42	8	9	25	26	77	−51	25	

Updated to match(es) played on 7 May 1980. Source: The Football Archives
Rules for classification: 1) points; 2) goal difference; 3) number of goals scored. The points system up until the 1982–83 season: 2 points for a win, 1 point for a draw and 0 points for losing.
(C) Champions; (P) Promoted

=== Results ===
Home \ Away	BRT	BUX	FRK	GAI	GAT	GOO	GRN	LNC	MAC	MAR	MAT	MOR	MOS	NET	OSW	RUN	SLI	SOU	TAM	WTN	WRK	WKS
Burton Albion		1–2	1–0	2–0	8–0	1–2	3–0	3–1	1–2	2–0	3–2	1–0	3–1	0–4	0–0	2–0	5–1	6–0	3–0	1–1	5–0	4–1
Buxton	2–1		1–1	1–1	0–2	3–0	1–1	3–1	2–0	2–0	2–3	1–0	0–1	0–0	2–1	2–1	4–3	1–1	3–1	2–1	2–0	1–0
Frickley Athletic	1–0	2–2		4–1	2–0	2–2	3–1	4–0	2–1	4–0	2–2	3–1	3–1	4–0	4–2	6–2	3–2	2–2	5–0	2–1	3–1	1–0
Gainsborough Trinity	0–1	3–2	1–2		1–0	1–1	4–1	1–0	0–2	1–1	1–0	2–1	2–3	4–5	2–3	3–1	1–0	1–2	2–0	2–3	3–0	1–0
Gateshead United	0–1	2–0	0–1	0–3		3–2	0–1	2–3	2–0	4–2	0–3	2–2	1–1	2–0	1–0	1–1	1–1	3–0	1–1	3–0	0–0	2–3
Goole Town	1–2	0–1	2–2	5–2	2–1		0–2	2–3	2–1	2–2	4–4	2–1	0–2	1–0	4–1	0–2	4–3	4–1	2–0	0–3	2–0	1–0
Grantham	0–3	2–1	1–1	1–1	4–2	1–0		2–2	2–1	1–1	2–3	3–1	0–1	2–3	3–0	3–2	6–2	2–1	6–0	0–3	3–1	1–3
Lancaster City	1–3	4–4	2–2	4–2	5–0	1–0	3–2		3–1	0–1	1–1	2–0	0–0	1–0	2–2	2–3	2–2	1–1	5–2	1–1	3–4	3–3
Macclesfield Town	3–1	0–0	1–1	4–1	0–0	0–1	1–1	3–2		0–4	1–1	3–1	2–2	4–0	3–1	3–2	0–0	1–0	4–0	3–1	3–0	0–1
Marine	3–1	0–1	2–2	4–1	1–1	1–1	1–2	3–4	3–4		2–2	1–1	1–0	3–0	0–2	2–0	5–2	2–0	1–0	0–1	2–2	2–0
Matlock Town	0–0	2–0	4–1	3–1	2–2	3–2	2–3	4–2	7–0	1–1		2–1	0–3	2–0	2–1	0–1	3–1	8–0	2–0	1–1	2–1	2–2
Morecambe	1–3	0–2	1–2	2–2	2–1	3–0	1–1	2–0	0–4	1–0	1–1		1–1	0–0	1–1	1–0	3–0	0–0	0–1	0–1	2–1	0–2
Mossley	3–2	2–1	2–1	4–2	6–1	2–2	3–0	2–1	2–1	3–1	2–2	1–0		1–0	0–0	1–1	4–0	3–0	6–0	0–3	5–1	3–1
Netherfield	1–1	0–1	0–2	2–4	2–0	1–1	1–0	1–2	2–2	0–4	0–0	1–1	0–0		0–0	2–0	1–1	1–1	2–3	0–2	2–2	0–0
Oswestry Town	1–1	2–1	1–1	1–0	2–0	0–0	2–1	2–0	1–1	1–0	1–1	0–0	0–1	2–0		2–0	1–3	1–0	1–2	1–4	2–0	1–1
Runcorn	0–1	0–2	0–4	1–2	1–1	0–0	1–0	1–1	0–2	1–0	1–1	4–1	0–3	4–2	2–2		0–0	0–1	0–0	1–2	3–0	0–2
South Liverpool	0–1	1–1	1–0	1–1	1–2	1–0	2–2	1–1	2–1	1–2	3–3	1–2	1–2	1–0	2–2	1–3		1–1	0–1	1–5	2–2	1–3
Southport	0–1	0–1	0–3	2–1	2–1	1–1	0–1	0–0	0–0	0–2	0–2	0–1	2–7	0–0	3–0	0–4	2–0		1–1	1–4	1–1	0–1
Tamworth	0–1	0–2	1–1	2–2	1–2	0–3	0–2	2–1	0–2	3–1	0–2	1–1	0–2	1–2	1–0	0–1	0–1	1–1		0–2	1–0	0–2
Witton Albion	3–0	3–1	3–0	2–0	5–0	0–0	4–0	1–0	1–0	2–0	1–1	3–0	4–1	3–0	2–0	3–0	1–2	0–1	0–0		3–0	1–1
Workington	2–2	4–1	1–2	1–1	2–1	1–1	0–5	2–4	0–0	1–3	2–1	1–3	0–4	3–1	3–1	0–0	2–2	4–0	0–0	2–3		3–0
Worksop Town	3–2	1–0	2–2	1–0	3–3	5–2	1–0	2–0	1–3	0–1	1–0	2–0	1–5	1–1	6–0	2–2	1–0	1–2	2–0	2–2	1–0	

Updated to match(es) played on 7 May 1980. Source: The Football Archives
Legend: Blue = home team win; Yellow = draw; Red = away team win.

=== Stadia and locations ===
Locations of the 1979–80 Northern Premier League teams

Club	Stadium
Burton Albion	Eton Park
Buxton	The Silverlands
Frickley Athletic	Westfield Lane
Gainsborough Trinity	The Northolme
Gateshead United	Gateshead Youth Stadium
Goole Town	Victoria Pleasure Ground
Grantham	London Road
Lancaster City	Great Axe
Macclesfield Town	Moss Rose
Marine	Rossett Park
Matlock Town	Causeway Lane
Morecambe	Christie Park
Mossley	Seel Park
Netherfield	Parkside
Oswestry Town	Victoria Road
Runcorn	Canal Street
South Liverpool	Holly Park
Southport	Haig Avenue
Tamworth	The Lamb Ground
Witton Albion	Central Ground
Workington	Borough Park
Worksop Town	Central Avenue

== Cup results ==
=== Challenge Cup ===
Home team	Score	Away team
Runcorn	2–0	Lancaster City

=== Northern Premier League Shield ===
Between Champions of NPL Premier Division and Winners of the NPL Cup.

Home team	Score	Away team
Runcorn	beat	Mossley

=== FA Cup ===
None of the twenty-two Northern Premier League clubs reached the second round:

First Round

Home team	Score	Away team	
Burton Albion	0–2	Bury	
Chester	5–1	Workington	
Morecambe	1–1	Rotherham United	Replay
Rotherham United	2–0	Morecambe	
York City	5–2	Mossley	

=== FA Trophy ===
Two of the twenty-two Northern Premier League clubs reached the fourth round:

Fourth Round

Home team	Score	Away team	
Mossley	1–1	Blyth Spartans	
Blyth Spartans	0–2	Mossley	Replay

Semi-finals

Stage	Home team	Score	Away team
1st Leg	Mossley	1–1	Boston United
2nd Leg	Boston United	1–2	Mossley
Aggregate	Mossley	3–2	Boston United

Final

Home team	Score	Away team
Dagenham	2–1	Mossley

== End of the season ==
At the end of the twelfth season of the Northern Premier League, Frickley Athletic applied to join the Alliance Premier League and were successful

=== Promotion and relegation ===
The following club left the League at the end of the season:

- Frickley Athletic promoted to Alliance Premier League

The following club joined the League the following season:

- King's Lynn transferred from Southern League Midland Division
