= 1979–80 FA Trophy =

1979-80 FA Trophy
FA Challenge Trophy

Tournament details
- Country: England; Wales
- Teams: 229

Final positions
- Champions: Dagenham
- Runners-up: Mossley

The 1979–80 FA Trophy was the eleventh season of the FA Trophy, and it was the first season that the newly formed Alliance Premier League would be Step 5 in the English Pyramid System.

== Preliminary round ==
=== Ties ===
Tie	Home team	Score	Away team
1	Addlestone	2-0	Tonbridge
2	Arnold	1-1	Emley
3	Bideford	1-0	Dawlish Town
4	Bilston	1-1	Long Eaton United
5	Bognor Regis Town	1-0	Camberley Town
6	Brereton Social	2-2	Darlaston
7	Chatham Town	2-1	Walton & Hersham
8	Cinderford Town	0-1	Dudley Town
9	Clacton Town	1-1	Lowestoft Town
10	Clandown	3-1	Glastonbury
11	Clapton	1-3	Finchley
12	Crawley Town	0-2	Epsom & Ewell
13	Gloucester City	2-2	Llanelli
14	Gosport Borough	2-1	Waterlooville
15	Hampton	2-0	Dunstable
16	Heanor Town	3-2	Louth United
17	Hertford Town	2-1	Chelmsford City
18	Horsham	0-2	Basingstoke Town
19	Keynsham Town	5-2	Paulton Rovers
20	Kingstonian	2-2	Hounslow
21	Kirkby Town	2-0	Middlewich Athletic
22	Leytonstone Ilford	0-0	Farnborough Town
23	Milton Keynes City	1-2	St Albans City
24	Oswestry Town	2-0	Bedworth United
25	Prestwich Heys	1-1	Alfreton Town
26	Pwllhelli & District	1-1	Colwyn Bay
27	Shepton Mallet Town	1-3	Bridport
28	Sittingbourne	2-1	Ashford Town (Kent)
29	Stourbridge	1-5	Alvechurch
30	Tamworth	0-4	Belper Town
31	Tiverton Town	1-2	Barnstaple Town
32	Ton Pentre	1-1	Clevedon Town
33	Ware	1-0	Cambridge City
34	Wellingborough Town	2-0	Chesham United
35	Weston super Mare	1-0	Bridgwater Town
36	Wisbech Town	3-0	Corby Town
37	Wokingham Town	2-1	Andover

=== Replays ===
Tie	Home team	Score	Away team
2	Emley	3-0	Arnold
4	Long Eaton United	2-0	Bilston
6	Darlaston	0-3	Brereton Social
9	Lowestoft Town	1-0	Clacton Town
13	Llanelli	0-7	Gloucester City
20	Hounslow	1-0	Kingstonian
22	Farnborough Town	1-2	Leytonstone Ilford
25	Alfreton Town	3-2	Prestwich Heys
26	Colwyn Bay	1-0	Pwllheli & District
32	Clevedon Town	1-1	Ton Pentre

=== 2nd replay ===
Tie	Home team	Score	Away team
32	Ton Pentre	1-1	Clevedon Town

=== 3rd replay ===
Tie	Home team	Score	Away team
32	Clevedon Town	2-1	Ton Pentre

== First qualifying round ==
=== Ties ===
Tie	Home team	Score	Away team
1	Addlestone	0-0	Bognor Regis Town
2	Alfreton Town	0-2	Accrington Stanley
3	Alvechurch	4-0	Moor Green
4	Aveley	1-0	Hampton
5	Banbury United	0-0	Aylesbury United
6	Barnet	0-0	Wealdstone
7	Barnstaple Town	4-1	Bridport
8	Basingstoke Town	2-2	Chatham Town
9	Belper Town	0-4	Worksop Town
10	Boston	3-1	Heanor Town
11	Brereton Social	4-0	Bridgend Town
12	Bridlington Trinity	1-1	Billingham Synthonia
13	Bromsgrove Rovers	3-1	Mangotsfield United
14	Burscough	0-1	Workington
15	Burton Albion	2-1	Leek Town
16	Buxton	1-1	Ashton United
17	Carshalton Athletic	2-1	Sheppey United
18	Clevedon Town	2-3	Sutton Coldfield Town
19	Colwyn Bay	3-0	Caernarfon Town
20	Dorchester Town	4-0	Ilminster Town
21	Droylsden	2-0	Shildon
22	Dudley Town	0-1	Lye Town
23	Durham City	1-1	Darwen
24	Emley	5-0	Sutton Town
25	Evenwood Town	2-4	Horden Colliery Welfare
26	Ferryhill Athletic	1-2	Frickley Athletic
27	Finchley	1-2	Harlow Town
28	Folkestone & Shepway	4-1	Sittingbourne
29	Formby	5-1	West Auckland Town
30	Gateshead	5-2	Whitley Bay
31	Gloucester City	2-2	Redditch United
32	Gosport Borough	1-1	Gravesend & Northfleet
33	Hertford Town	3-0	St Albans City
34	Highgate United	1-3	A P Leamington
35	Hitchin Town	4-0	Spalding United
36	Hounslow	1-2	Leytonstone Ilford
37	Hyde United	3-0	New Mills{1}
38	Keynsham Town	4-2	Bideford
39	Long Eaton United - Bye		
40	Macclesfield Town	5-2	Kirkby Town
41	Maidenhead United	1-2	Tilbury
42	Mexborough Town Athletic	5-2	North Shields
43	Nantwich Town	1-1	Eastwood Town
44	Oswestry Town	1-1	South Liverpool
45	Oxford City	1-0	King's Lynn
46	Penrith	0-0	Netherfield
47	Poole Town	1-1	Weston super Mare
48	Radcliffe Borough	3-3	South Bank
49	Ramsgate	0-1	Metropolitan Police
50	Rhyl	3-2	New Brighton
51	Salisbury	1-0	Croydon
52	Southall & Ealing Borough	0-0	Epsom & Ewell
53	St Helens Town	2-0	Bootle
54	Staines Town	0-3	Bromley
55	Stalybridge Celtic	2-2	Tow Law Town
56	Sudbury Town	2-0	Bishop's Stortford
57	Trowbridge Town	3-1	Taunton Town
58	Ware	5-0	Wisbech Town
59	Wellingborough Town	0-1	Harwich & Parkeston
60	Welton Rovers	2-2	Clandown
61	Wembley	0-1	Boreham Wood
62	Willington	0-2	Fleetwood Town
63	Witney Town	0-0	Lowestoft Town
64	Wokingham Town	1-1	Fareham Town

=== Replays ===
Tie	Home team	Score	Away team
1	Bognor Regis Town	1-2	Addlestone
5	Aylesbury United	2-0	Banbury United
6	Wealdstone	1-1	Barnet
8	Chatham Town	0-1	Basingstoke Town
12	Billingham Synthonia	2-1	Bridlington Trinity
16	Ashton United	4-2	Buxton
23	Darwen	0-1	Durham City
31	Redditch United	4-3	Gloucester City
32	Gravesend & Northfleet	2-1	Gosport Borough
43	Eastwood Town	2-0	Nantwich Town
44	South Liverpool	3-5	Oswestry Town
46	Netherfield	1-3	Penrith
47	Weston super Mare	2-1	Poole Town
48	South Bank	3-0	Radcliffe Borough
52	Epsom & Ewell	4-0	Southall & Ealing Borough
55	Tow Law Town	0-1	Stalybridge Celtic
60	Clandown	1-2	Welton Rovers
63	Lowestoft Town	4-8	Witney Town
64	Fareham Town	1-2	Wokingham Town

=== 2nd replay ===
Tie	Home team	Score	Away team
6	Barnet	2-0	Wealdstone

== Second qualifying round ==
=== Ties ===
Tie	Home team	Score	Away team
1	A P Leamington	1-2	Boston
2	Accrington Stanley	2-2	Droylsden
3	Alvechurch	0-0	Hitchin Town
4	Aylesbury United	2-1	Brereton Social
5	Boreham Wood	3-1	Harlow Town
6	Bromley	0-2	Addlestone
7	Burton Albion	2-0	Colwyn Bay
8	Carshalton Athletic	2-1	Gravesend & Northfleet
9	Dorchester Town	2-0	Barnstaple Town
10	Durham City	1-1	Emley
11	Eastwood Town	0-1	Oswestry Town
12	Fleetwood Town	2-2	Mexborough Town Athletic
13	Folkestone & Shepway	3-0	Basingstoke Town
14	Gateshead	1-7	Frickley Athletic
15	Harwich & Parkeston	1-1	Witney Town
16	Keynsham Town	2-3	Weston super Mare
17	Leytonstone Ilford	1-2	Barnet
18	Long Eaton United	3-2	Worksop Town
19	Lye Town	1-0	Bromsgrove Rovers
20	Macclesfield Town	1-0	Ashton United
21	Metropolitan Police	3-0	Tilbury
22	Oxford City	1-0	Salisbury
23	Penrith	2-3	Billingham Synthonia
24	Rhyl	2-2	Hyde United
25	South Bank	0-2	Horden Colliery Welfare
26	St Helens Town	1-1	Formby
27	Sudbury Town	0-1	Hertford Town
28	Sutton Coldfield Town	2-3	Redditch United
29	Ware	1-0	Aveley
30	Welton Rovers	2-2	Trowbridge Town
31	Wokingham Town	2-0	Epsom & Ewell
32	Workington	1-1	Stalybridge Celtic

=== Replays ===
Tie	Home team	Score	Away team
2	Droylsden	2-1	Accrington Stanley
3	Hitchin Town	2-4	Alvechurch
10	Emley	1-0	Durham City
12	Mexborough Town Athletic	2-0	Fleetwood Town
15	Witney Town	0-0	Harwich & Parkeston
24	Hyde United	5-1	Rhyl
26	Formby	0-1	St Helens Town
30	Trowbridge Town	4-2	Welton Rovers
32	Stalybridge Celtic	3-1	Workington

=== 2nd replay ===
Tie	Home team	Score	Away team
15	Harwich & Parkeston	2-1	Witney Town

== Third qualifying round ==
=== Ties ===
Tie	Home team	Score	Away team
1	Addlestone	1-2	Dartford
2	Barrow	5-2	Goole Town
3	Bath City	2-0	Trowbridge Town
4	Boreham Wood	0-4	Dulwich Hamlet
5	Boston	3-2	Oxford City
6	Burton Albion	4-1	Enderby Town
7	Carshalton Athletic	2-1	Harwich & Parkeston
8	Crook Town	2-1	Billingham Synthonia
9	Dover	3-0	Hillingdon Borough
10	Emley	2-0	Consett
11	Frome Town	3-1	Falmouth Town
12	Gainsborough Trinity	1-0	Horwich R M I
13	Grantham	3-1	Redditch United
14	Harrow Borough	1-2	Wokingham Town
15	Hastings United	3-0	Margate
16	Hayes	0-1	Barnet
17	Hednesford Town	0-1	Oswestry Town
18	Hertford Town	1-0	Ware
19	Horden Colliery Welfare	0-0	St Helens Town
20	Hyde United	0-0	Alvechurch
21	Kidderminster Harriers	2-2	Long Eaton United
22	Merthyr Tydfil	2-2	Weston super Mare
23	Metropolitan Police	0-2	Aylesbury United
24	Mexborough Town Athletic	1-0	Droylsden
25	Minehead	0-0	Dorchester Town
26	Morecambe	1-0	Southport
27	Northwich Victoria	2-0	Lye Town
28	Stalybridge Celtic	1-0	Frickley Athletic
29	Sutton United	0-2	Walthamstow Avenue
30	Whitby Town	1-3	Ashington
31	Witton Albion	1-3	Macclesfield Town
32	Woking	2-1	Folkestone & Shepway

=== Replays ===
Tie	Home team	Score	Away team
19	St Helens Town	0-1	Horden Colliery Welfare
20	Alvechurch	2-3	Hyde United
21	Long Eaton United	2-3	Kidderminster Harriers
22	Weston super Mare	0-2	Merthyr Tydfil
25	Dorchester Town	1-1	Minehead

=== 2nd replay ===
Tie	Home team	Score	Away team
25	Minehead	1-2	Dorchester Town

== 1st round ==
The teams that given byes to this round are Stafford Rangers, Worcester City, Kettering Town, Altrincham, Telford United, Maidstone United, Scarborough, Boston United, Weymouth, Yeovil Town, Nuneaton Borough, Bangor City, Matlock Town, Bedford Town, Runcorn, Lancaster City, Enfield, Wycombe Wanderers, Dagenham, Tooting & Mitcham United, Leatherhead, Spennymoor United, Hendon, Slough Town, Winsford United, Marine, Blyth Spartans, Cheltenham Town, Mossley, Barking, Chorley and Bishop Auckland.

=== Ties ===
Tie	Home team	Score	Away team
1	Aylesbury United	0-4	Dulwich Hamlet
2	Bangor City	5-1	Telford United
3	Barking	1-0	Enfield
4	Barrow	3-2	Bishop Auckland
5	Blyth Spartans	1-1	Emley
6	Burton Albion	2-0	Winsford United
7	Carshalton Athletic	0-4	Weymouth
8	Crook Town	2-3	Ashington
9	Dartford	1-1	Bath City
10	Dorchester Town	0-1	Dagenham
11	Frome Town	1-2	Hastings United
12	Gainsborough Trinity	2-1	Scarborough
13	Grantham	1-1	Altrincham
14	Hendon	1-1	Barnet
15	Hertford Town	3-0	Slough Town
16	Horden Colliery Welfare	1-2	Morecambe
17	Hyde United	2-2	Nuneaton Borough
18	Kettering Town	0-3	Merthyr Tydfil
19	Macclesfield Town	1-2	Matlock Town
20	Maidstone United	2-2	Yeovil Town
21	Marine	3-1	Kidderminster Harriers
22	Mexborough Town Athletic	1-1	Chorley
23	Mossley	3-1	Spennymoor United
24	Oswestry Town	2-1	Northwich Victoria
25	Runcorn	1-1	Boston United
26	Stafford Rangers	1-1	Boston
27	Stalybridge Celtic	2-0	Lancaster City
28	Tooting & Mitcham United	2-0	Worcester City
29	Walthamstow Avenue	1-2	Cheltenham Town
30	Woking	0-0	Dover
31	Wokingham Town	0-1	Leatherhead
32	Wycombe Wanderers	0-0	Bedford Town

=== Replays ===
Tie	Home team	Score	Away team
5	Emley	2-4	Blyth Spartans
9	Bath City	6-1	Dartford
13	Altrincham	6-3	Grantham
14	Barnet	1-0	Hendon
17	Nuneaton Borough	4-1	Hyde United
20	Yeovil Town	4-2	Maidstone United
22	Chorley	4-0	Mexborough Town Athletic
25	Boston United	2-1	Runcorn
26	Boston	2-1	Stafford Rangers
30	Dover	0-1	Woking
32	Bedford Town	0-1	Wycombe Wanderers

== 2nd round ==
=== Ties ===
Tie	Home team	Score	Away team
1	Altrincham	2-0	Morecambe
2	Ashington	0-2	Woking
3	Barnet	4-1	Bangor City
4	Barrow	2-0	Cheltenham Town
5	Blyth Spartans	3-0	Barking
6	Boston	0-0	Mossley
7	Burton Albion	4-2	Wycombe Wanderers
8	Dulwich Hamlet	2-1	Hertford Town
9	Hastings United	2-0	Oswestry Town
10	Leatherhead	0-2	Weymouth
11	Marine	1-1	Matlock Town
12	Merthyr Tydfil	0-2	Bath City
13	Nuneaton Borough	2-1	Gainsborough Trinity
14	Stalybridge Celtic	0-5	Dagenham
15	Tooting & Mitcham United	0-1	Boston United
16	Yeovil Town	5-2	Chorley

=== Replays ===
Tie	Home team	Score	Away team
6	Mossley	6-3	Boston
11	Matlock Town	0-1	Marine

== 3rd round ==
=== Ties ===
Tie	Home team	Score	Away team
1	Altrincham	1-5	Mossley
2	Barrow	4-0	Hastings United
3	Bath City	1-3	Dulwich Hamlet
4	Blyth Spartans	1-0	Yeovil Town
5	Boston United	2-2	Weymouth
6	Burton Albion	1-1	Dagenham
7	Marine	0-2	Woking
8	Nuneaton Borough	2-1	Barnet

=== Replays ===
Tie	Home team	Score	Away team
5	Weymouth	0-1	Boston United
6	Dagenham	3-1	Burton Albion

== 4th round ==
=== Ties ===
Tie	Home team	Score	Away team
1	Boston United	0-0	Dulwich Hamlet
2	Dagenham	3-2	Nuneaton Borough
3	Mossley	1-1	Blyth Spartans
4	Woking	3-1	Barrow

=== Replays ===
Tie	Home team	Score	Away team
1	Dulwich Hamlet	0-2	Boston United
3	Blyth Spartans	0-2	Mossley

== Semi finals ==
=== First leg ===
Tie	Home team	Score	Away team
1	Mossley	1-1	Boston United
2	Woking	1-3	Dagenham

=== Second leg ===
Tie	Home team	Score	Away team	Aggregate
1	Boston United	1-2	Mossley	2-3
2	Dagenham	4-1	Woking	7-2

== Final ==
Home team	Score	Away team
Dagenham	2-1	Mossley
