= John Black (footballer, born 1957) =

Scottish footballer

Personal information
- Full name: John Black
- Date of birth: 10 November 1957 (age 68)
- Place of birth: Helensburgh, Scotland
- Position: Left winger

Youth career
- –: Wolverhampton Wanderers

Senior career*
Years	Team	Apps	(Gls)
1977–1980	Wolverhampton Wanderers	6	(0)
1980	→ Bradford City (loan)	6	(4)
1980–1983	Bradford City	49	(9)
1983–1984	Hereford United	9	(0)
1984–	Scarborough	4	(0)
Total		74	(13)
- * Club domestic league appearances and goals

John Black (born 10 November 1957) is a Scottish former professional footballer who played as a winger. Black played in the English Football League for Wolverhampton Wanderers, Bradford City, and Hereford United, before playing non-league football with Scarborough.

He was born in 1957 in Helensburgh, Scotland.
