= Stan Fox (footballer) =

English footballer

Personal information
- Full name: William Stanley Fox
- Date of birth: 4 July 1906
- Place of birth: Sheffield, England
- Date of death: 20 August 1979 (aged 73)
- Place of death: York, England
- Height: 5 ft 9 in (1.75 m)
- Positions: Right half; right back

Senior career*
Years	Team	Apps	(Gls)
1929–1930	Sheffield United	0	(0)
1930–1931	Bury	0	(0)
1931–1938	York City	136	(4)
- * Club domestic league appearances and goals

William Stanley Fox (4 July 1906 – 20 August 1979) was an English footballer.

== Career ==
Fox started his career with Sheffield United in 1929. After making no league appearances for the club, he joined Bury in 1930. He joined York City in 1931. After leaving the club, he received a benefit match against Southport in May 1938.

He worked for Cooke, Troughton & Sims and British Rail until he retired in 1971.
