= Martin Patching =

English footballer (1958–2023)

Personal information
- Full name: Martin Patching
- Date of birth: 1 November 1958
- Place of birth: Rotherham, West Riding of Yorkshire, England
- Date of death: December 2023 (aged 65)
- Place of death: Rotherham
- Position: Midfielder

Youth career
- 1973–1975: Wolverhampton Wanderers

Senior career*
Years	Team	Apps	(Gls)
1975–1979	Wolverhampton Wanderers	90	(10)
1979–1983	Watford	25	(3)
1983	→ Northampton Town (loan)	6	(1)
1985–1987	Dunstable		
1987–1996	Staines Town		
1996	Hendon	1	(0)
Total		122	(14)

International career
1974	England Schoolboys	7	(1)
1976–1977	England Youth	7	(0)
- * Club domestic league appearances and goals

Martin Patching (1 November 1958 – December 2023) was an English professional footballer who played as a midfielder in the Football League for Wolverhampton Wanderers, Watford and Northampton Town, in non-League football for Dunstable, Staines Town and Hendon, and in Sunday league football for Hemel Hempstead Spinners. He was capped by the England schools team and the national youth team in 1977. Patching scouted for Watford and Nottingham Forest after retiring from playing. His son, Cauley Woodrow, is a professional footballer. Patching died in December 2023, at the age of 65.
