= 1979–80 Southern Football League =

The 1979–80 Southern Football League season was the 77th in the history of the league, an English football competition.

At the end of the previous season the Alliance Premier League was established as a new, national top division of non-League football. Thirteen clubs from the Premier Division joined the new league, leading to a restructuring of the Southern League for this season, in which it was divided solely into Midland and Southern divisions. Bridgend Town won the Midland Division, whilst Dorchester Town won the Southern Division. Bridgend were declared Southern League champions after defeating Dorchester 3–0 at home and 2–1 away to win a championship play-off. There was no promotion to the Alliance Premier League and no relegation to feeder leagues.

== Midland Division ==
At the end of the previous season Alliance Premier League on the top of non-league was created. Following that Southern Football League was restructured with Midland and Southern divisions replacing three old divisions. The Midland Division consisted of 22 clubs, including 16 clubs from the previous season Division One North and six new clubs:

- Three clubs from the Premier Division:
  - Bridgend Town
  - Cheltenham Town
  - Witney Town
- Three clubs from Division One South:
  - Minehead
  - Trowbridge Town
  - Taunton Town

=== League table ===
Southern Football League Midland Division
- Season: 1979–80
- Champions: Bridgend Town
- Matches: 462
- Goals: 1,293 (2.8 per match)

Pos	Team	Pld	W	D	L	GF	GA	GD	Pts	Promotion or relegation
1	Bridgend Town	42	28	6	8	85	39	+46	62	
2	Minehead	42	22	15	5	70	42	+28	59	
3	Bedford Town	42	20	12	10	71	42	+29	52	
4	Kidderminster Harriers	42	23	6	13	81	59	+22	52	
5	Merthyr Tydfil	42	20	11	11	70	47	+23	51	
6	Enderby Town	42	21	8	13	62	50	+12	50	
7	Stourbridge	42	19	11	12	67	49	+18	49	
8	Alvechurch	42	17	14	11	78	60	+18	48	
9	Trowbridge Town	42	19	9	14	62	61	+1	47	
10	Bromsgrove Rovers	42	18	10	14	67	56	+11	46	
11	Barry Town	42	15	12	15	64	58	+6	42	
12	King's Lynn	42	15	11	16	48	55	−7	41	Transferred to the Northern Premier League
13	Banbury United	42	13	14	15	56	56	0	40	
14	Taunton Town	42	16	8	18	55	62	−7	40	
15	Witney Town	42	10	19	13	43	45	−2	39	
16	Bedworth United	42	12	15	15	40	42	−2	39	
17	Milton Keynes City	42	15	7	20	46	59	−13	37	
18	Gloucester City	42	10	14	18	55	68	−13	32 (Note: Gloucester City were deducted two points.)	
19	Cheltenham Town	42	13	5	24	49	70	−21	31	
20	Wellingborough Town	42	9	7	26	54	106	−52	25	
21	Cambridge City	42	6	9	27	30	73	−43	21	
22	Corby Town	42	5	9	28	40	94	−54	19	

Source: fchd.com rsssf.com
Rules for classification: 1) points; 2) goal difference; 3) number of goals scored.

== Southern Division ==
At the end of the previous season Alliance Premier League on the top of non-league was created. Following that Southern Football League was restructured with Midland and Southern divisions replacing three old divisions. The Southern Division consisted of 24 clubs, including 18 clubs from the previous season Division One South and six new clubs:

- Five clubs from the Premier Division:
  - Dartford
  - Dorchester Town
  - Hastings United
  - Hillingdon Borough
  - Margate
- Plus:
  - Fareham Town, joined from the Hampshire League

At the end of the season Addlestone was renamed Addlestone & Weybridge Town and Folkestone and Shepway was renamed Folkestone.

=== League table ===
Southern Football League Southern Division
- Season: 1979–80
- Champions: Dorchester Town
- Matches: 552
- Goals: 1,465 (2.65 per match)

Pos	Team	Pld	W	D	L	GF	GA	GD	Pts
1	Dorchester Town	46	25	12	9	81	53	+28	62
2	Aylesbury United	46	25	11	10	73	40	+33	61
3	Dover	46	22	13	11	78	47	+31	57
4	Gosport Borough	46	21	15	10	70	50	+20	57
5	Dartford	46	21	14	11	66	45	+21	56
6	Bognor Regis Town	46	20	15	11	66	38	+28	55
7	Hillingdon Borough	46	19	16	11	64	41	+23	54
8	Dunstable	46	17	19	10	93	64	+29	53
9	Addlestone	46	20	13	13	72	57	+15	53
10	Hastings United	46	19	15	12	74	65	+9	53
11	Fareham Town	46	16	16	14	61	53	+8	48
12	Waterlooville	46	17	12	17	67	64	+3	46
13	Andover	46	16	13	17	65	65	0	45
14	Poole Town	46	16	13	17	49	64	−15	45
15	Canterbury City	46	15	14	17	56	60	−4	44
16	Hounslow	46	14	15	17	44	57	−13	43
17	Margate	46	17	8	21	51	62	−11	42
18	Folkestone & Shepway	46	14	11	21	54	63	−9	39
19	Ashford Town (Kent)	46	12	14	20	54	71	−17	38
20	Crawley Town	46	13	11	22	55	72	−17	37
21	Chelmsford City	46	9	18	19	47	69	−22	36
22	Basingstoke Town	46	9	15	22	48	79	−31	33
23	Salisbury	46	10	12	24	47	58	−11	32
24	Tonbridge Angels	46	3	9	34	30	128	−98	15

Source: fchd.com rsssf.com
Rules for classification: 1) points; 2) goal difference; 3) number of goals scored.

== See also ==
- Southern Football League
- 1979–80 Isthmian League
- 1979–80 Northern Premier League
