= 1978–79 Northern Premier League =

Northern Premier League
- Season: 1978–79
- Champions: Mossley
- Promoted: Altrincham; Scarborough; Boston United; Stafford Rangers; Northwich Victoria; Bangor City; Barrow
- Relegated: none
- Matches: 506
- Goals: 1,414 (2.79 per match)
- Biggest home win: Stafford Rangers 7–0 Netherfield (11 November 1978)
- Biggest away win: Workington 0–6 Mossley (31 January 1979)
- Highest scoring: Lancaster City 5–3 Macclesfield Town (25 November 1978)
- Longest winning run: 7 matches Mossley (20 January 1979 – 24 March 1979)
- Longest unbeaten run: 18 matches Mossley (25 November 1978 – 14 April 1979)
- Longest winless run: 19 matches Gateshead (23 September 1978 – 5 March 1979)
- Longest losing run: 6 matches Netherfield (11 November 1978 – 16 December 1978) Macclesfield Town (25 November 1978 – 24 February 1979) Macclesfield Town (18 April 1979 – 28 April 1979)

The 1978–79 Northern Premier League was the eleventh season of the Northern Premier League, a regional football league in Northern England, the northern areas of the Midlands and North Wales. The season began on 19 August 1978 and concluded on 21 May 1979.

== Overview ==
The League featured twenty-three clubs.

=== Team changes ===
The following two clubs left the League at the end of the previous season:

- Wigan Athletic promoted to Football League Fourth Division
- Great Harwood folded

The following club joined the League at the start of the season:

- Southport demoted from Football League Fourth Division

=== League table ===
Pos	Team	Pld	W	D	L	GF	GA	GD	Pts	Qualification or relegation
1	Mossley (C)	44	32	5	7	117	48	+69	69	
2	Altrincham (P)	44	25	11	8	93	39	+54	61	Promoted to Alliance Premier League
3	Matlock Town	44	24	8	12	100	59	+41	56	
4	Scarborough (P)	44	19	14	11	61	44	+17	52	Promoted to Alliance Premier League
5	Southport	44	19	14	11	62	49	+13	52	
6	Boston United (P)	44	17	18	9	40	33	+7	52	Promoted to Alliance Premier League
7	Runcorn	44	21	9	14	79	54	+25	51	
8	Stafford Rangers (P)	44	18	14	12	67	41	+26	50	Promoted to Alliance Premier League
9	Goole Town	44	17	15	12	56	61	−5	49	
10	Northwich Victoria (P)	44	18	11	15	64	52	+12	47	Promoted to Alliance Premier League
11	Lancaster City	44	17	12	15	62	54	+8	46	
12	Bangor City (P)	44	15	14	15	65	66	−1	44	Promoted to Alliance Premier League
13	Worksop Town	44	13	14	17	55	67	−12	40	
14	Workington	44	16	7	21	62	74	−12	39	
15	Netherfield	44	13	11	20	39	69	−30	37	
16	Barrow (P)	44	14	9	21	47	78	−31	37	Promoted to Alliance Premier League
17	Gainsborough Trinity	44	12	12	20	52	67	−15	36	
18	Morecambe	44	11	13	20	55	65	−10	35	
19	Frickley Athletic	44	13	9	22	58	70	−12	35	
20	South Liverpool	44	12	10	22	48	85	−37	34	
21	Gateshead	44	11	11	22	42	63	−21	33	
22	Buxton	44	11	9	24	50	84	−34	31	
23	Macclesfield Town	44	8	10	26	40	92	−52	26	

Updated to match(es) played on 21 May 1979. Source: The Football Archives
Rules for classification: 1) points; 2) goal difference; 3) number of goals scored. The points system up until the 1982–83 season: 2 points for a win, 1 point for a draw and 0 points for losing.
(C) Champions; (P) Promoted

=== Results ===
Home \ Away	ALT	BAN	BRW	BOS	BUX	FRK	GAI	GAT	GOO	LNC	MAC	MAT	MOR	MOS	NET	NOR	RUN	SCA	SLI	SOU	STA	WRK	WOK
Altrincham		3–2	4–0	3–0	0–1	1–2	3–0	2–0	2–1	0–0	0–1	3–1	1–1	0–1	1–0	1–1	2–1	2–0	5–1	1–3	0–0	3–2	4–1
Bangor City	1–1		1–3	1–1	2–0	4–2	1–1	1–2	2–2	2–1	2–1	3–3	4–0	3–1	1–1	1–0	1–2	0–0	3–0	0–2	0–2	2–0	2–4
Barrow	1–6	0–1		0–0	1–0	1–0	2–1	4–2	0–0	2–1	1–2	3–2	0–0	2–5	3–3	2–4	0–3	0–1	0–0	0–2	1–1	1–2	1–1
Boston United	1–4	1–1	2–0		1–0	2–0	1–0	1–1	0–0	0–0	2–0	2–1	3–0	1–0	0–0	1–0	0–0	0–0	1–0	1–0	0–1	2–1	2–2
Buxton	0–4	5–1	2–1	0–0		1–0	1–1	0–1	2–1	3–1	2–1	1–3	1–6	1–3	1–1	0–2	0–2	0–3	4–1	1–1	0–1	0–4	1–2
Frickley Athletic	0–4	1–3	1–2	1–1	2–1		4–0	1–1	1–2	3–2	3–1	1–3	1–1	0–2	5–0	1–3	1–0	1–0	6–0	1–3	0–3	3–1	1–1
Gainsborough Trinity	2–4	1–1	1–2	2–0	1–2	1–1		0–1	1–2	1–0	2–1	3–3	2–1	2–1	0–1	0–1	2–3	1–2	1–2	3–0	1–0	3–0	1–2
Gateshead United	0–3	2–4	1–2	0–1	0–0	1–0	1–0		0–1	0–1	0–1	1–2	2–0	1–3	1–3	2–2	1–1	1–2	1–1	2–1	1–1	0–1	0–2
Goole Town	1–1	3–1	3–1	0–0	3–3	2–0	0–0	0–0		0–0	2–0	1–1	3–2	0–4	1–0	1–0	3–0	2–2	2–1	0–2	2–1	2–1	1–2
Lancaster City	0–4	3–1	0–1	0–2	4–1	1–3	3–0	1–0	1–2		5–3	0–0	4–2	2–3	0–0	1–0	2–3	1–0	4–0	2–2	1–0	4–1	1–1
Macclesfield Town	1–5	0–0	1–1	0–2	2–2	0–2	2–2	0–1	1–2	0–1		0–4	1–3	1–1	1–1	1–0	3–2	1–1	3–2	1–1	0–2	3–0	1–0
Matlock Town	2–0	1–2	0–1	1–0	4–1	1–0	2–3	4–1	2–2	2–0	5–0		1–1	2–4	2–1	3–2	2–3	6–0	3–1	1–1	3–2	5–1	1–1
Morecambe	2–4	3–1	0–0	0–0	3–1	1–1	2–2	1–2	3–2	2–0	4–0	0–1		1–2	3–1	0–0	1–0	1–3	2–1	0–1	0–1	2–0	1–4
Mossley	1–1	3–0	6–1	1–1	3–1	4–3	2–0	3–3	5–1	3–1	5–0	3–1	3–2		2–0	2–3	4–2	2–2	6–0	1–2	2–1	4–1	4–0
Netherfield	0–0	1–0	0–1	0–2	2–4	1–0	0–2	0–0	3–0	0–0	2–0	1–6	0–0	1–3		3–1	0–2	1–0	3–1	2–1	1–1	1–0	2–0
Northwich Victoria	1–0	1–2	3–0	3–0	0–0	4–0	1–2	3–1	0–0	2–2	3–0	2–1	0–0	2–0	3–0		2–3	2–0	0–0	2–2	2–0	2–1	1–1
Runcorn	0–0	0–0	2–1	4–2	6–0	0–1	3–0	2–0	4–0	1–3	6–0	2–3	2–0	0–2	4–0	1–2		0–0	4–1	0–0	3–2	0–0	2–0
Scarborough	1–2	1–1	1–0	0–0	1–1	2–0	3–0	2–1	3–1	1–3	2–2	0–1	0–0	2–1	5–0	4–0	3–0		2–0	1–0	1–1	2–1	2–0
South Liverpool	1–1	1–1	2–0	3–1	1–0	3–0	2–2	0–1	2–0	0–2	1–1	0–3	3–1	0–1	2–1	2–1	4–1	2–0		0–1	0–2	1–1	1–0
Southport	3–1	0–0	1–2	1–0	2–1	0–0	3–3	0–2	1–1	2–2	3–2	2–1	1–0	0–1	2–1	2–2	0–3	1–2	2–2		1–2	3–1	2–0
Stafford Rangers	1–1	3–2	4–2	0–0	4–3	1–0	0–1	1–1	3–0	1–1	2–0	1–2	0–0	0–2	7–0	3–0	4–0	0–0	5–1	1–1		0–2	0–0
Workington	0–4	3–1	3–0	1–2	2–1	2–2	0–0	3–2	3–3	0–0	2–0	1–0	3–1	0–6	0–1	4–1	1–1	3–2	6–1	0–2	1–0		3–0
Worksop Town	1–2	1–3	3–1	1–1	0–1	3–3	1–1	2–1	0–1	0–1	3–1	2–5	3–2	1–2	1–0	2–0	1–1	2–2	1–1	0–2	2–2	1–0	

Updated to match(es) played on 21 May 1979. Source: The Football Archives
Legend: Blue = home team win; Yellow = draw; Red = away team win.

=== Stadia and locations ===
Locations of the 1978–79 Northern Premier League teams

Club	Stadium
Altrincham	Moss Lane
Bangor City	Farrar Road
Barrow	Holker Street
Boston United	York Street
Buxton	The Silverlands
Frickley Athletic	Westfield Lane
Gainsborough Trinity	The Northolme
Gateshead United	Gateshead Youth Stadium
Goole Town	Victoria Pleasure Ground
Lancaster City	Great Axe
Macclesfield Town	Moss Rose
Matlock Town	Causeway Lane
Morecambe	Christie Park
Mossley	Seel Park
Netherfield	Parkside
Northwich Victoria	Drill Field
Runcorn	Canal Street
Scarborough	Athletic Ground
South Liverpool	Holly Park
Southport	Haig Avenue
Stafford Rangers	Marston Road
Workington	Borough Park
Worksop Town	Central Avenue

== Cup results ==
=== Challenge Cup ===
Home team	Score	Away team
Mossley	4–1	Northwich Victoria

=== Northern Premier League Shield ===
Between Champions of NPL Premier Division and Winners of the NPL Cup.
As Mossley won both the Northern Premier League and the Challenge Cup, Altrincham qualified as 2nd placed team of the NPL.

Home team	Score	Away team
Altrincham	beat	Mossley

=== FA Cup ===
Only two of the twenty-four Northern Premier League clubs reached the second round:

Second Round

Home team	Score	Away team
Droylsden	0–2	Altrincham
York City	3–0	Scarborough

Third Round

Home team	Score	Away team	
Tottenham Hotspur	1–1	Altrincham	
Altrincham	0–3	Tottenham Hotspur	Replay

=== FA Trophy ===
Two of the twenty-four Northern Premier League clubs reached the fourth round:

Fourth Round

Home team	Score	Away team	
Bishop Auckland	1–1	Stafford Rangers	
Stafford Rangers	3–1	Bishop Auckland	Replay
Runcorn	2–1	Hayes	

Semi-finals

Stage	Home team	Score	Away team
1st Leg	Runcorn	1–2	Stafford Rangers
2nd Leg	Stafford Rangers	1–1	Runcorn
Aggregate	Stafford Rangers	3–2	Runcorn

Final

Home team	Score	Away team
Stafford Rangers	2–0	Kettering Town

== End of the season ==
At the end of the eleventh season of the Northern Premier League, Altrincham who was put forward for election did not receive enough votes to be promoted to the Football League.

The Alliance Premier League was established as a new, national top division of non-League football. Seven Northern Premier League clubs and thirteen clubs from the Premier Division of the Southern League joined the newly created Alliance Premier League. The remaining clubs in the Northern Premier League had effectively been relegated down one tier in the English football league system.

=== Football League elections ===
Alongside the four Football League clubs facing re-election, two non-League clubs, one from the Northern Premier League and the other from the Southern League, applied to be elected. All four Football League clubs were re-elected.

Club	League	Votes
Doncaster Rovers	Football League Division Four	50
Crewe Alexandra	Football League Division Four	49
Darlington	Football League Division Four	43
Halifax Town	Football League Division Four	37
Altrincham	Northern Premier League	13
Kettering Town	Southern League Premier Division	12

=== Promotion and relegation ===
The number of clubs reduced from twenty-three to twenty-two for the following season.

The following seven clubs left the league at the end of the season:

- Altrincham promoted to Alliance Premier League
- Bangor City promoted to Alliance Premier League
- Barrow promoted to Alliance Premier League
- Boston United promoted to Alliance Premier League
- Northwich Victoria promoted to Alliance Premier League
- Scarborough promoted to Alliance Premier League
- Stafford Rangers promoted to Alliance Premier League

The following six clubs joined the league the following season:

- Burton Albion promoted from Southern League Division One North
- Grantham promoted from Southern League Division One North
- Marine promoted from Cheshire County League Division One
- Oswestry Town promoted from Southern League Division One North
- Tamworth promoted from Southern League Division One North
- Witton Albion promoted from Cheshire County League Division One
