= 1978–79 Cheshire County Football League =

Cheshire County League
- Season: 1978–79

The 1978–79 Cheshire County Football League was the 55th in the history of the Cheshire County League, a football competition in England. Teams were divided into two divisions.

== Division One ==
Cheshire County Football League Division One
- Season: 1978–79
- Champions: Horwich RMI
- Promoted: Witton Albion; Marine
- Relegated: New Brighton; Middlewich Athletic

The division featured 1 new team:

- Fleetwood Town

=== League table ===
| Pos | Team | Pld | W | D | L | GF | GA | GD | Pts | Promotion or relegation |
|---|---|---|---|---|---|---|---|---|---|---|
| 1 | Horwich RMI (C) | 42 | 35 | 2 | 5 | 89 | 45 | +44 | 72 | |
| 2 | Witton Albion (P) | 42 | 30 | 4 | 8 | 114 | 38 | +76 | 64 | Promotion to Northern Premier League |
| 3 | Marine (P) | 42 | 29 | 5 | 8 | 104 | 38 | +66 | 63 | Promotion to Northern Premier League |
| 4 | Stalybridge Celtic | 42 | 25 | 5 | 12 | 93 | 47 | +46 | 55 | |
| 5 | Burscough | 42 | 19 | 15 | 8 | 59 | 31 | +28 | 53 | |
| 6 | Winsford United | 42 | 21 | 11 | 10 | 74 | 49 | +25 | 53 | |
| 7 | Chorley | 42 | 21 | 8 | 13 | 66 | 43 | +23 | 50 | |
| 8 | Formby | 42 | 20 | 9 | 13 | 73 | 57 | +16 | 49 | |
| 9 | Leek Town | 42 | 19 | 10 | 13 | 62 | 43 | +19 | 48 | |
| 10 | Droylsden | 42 | 18 | 9 | 15 | 62 | 61 | +1 | 45 | |
| 11 | Nantwich Town | 42 | 18 | 8 | 16 | 76 | 72 | +4 | 44 | |
| 12 | Fleetwood Town | 42 | 17 | 10 | 15 | 70 | 68 | +2 | 44 | |
| 13 | Hyde United | 42 | 15 | 12 | 15 | 59 | 57 | +2 | 42 | |
| 14 | St Helens Town | 42 | 16 | 9 | 17 | 59 | 57 | +2 | 41 | |
| 15 | Darwen | 42 | 15 | 9 | 18 | 52 | 53 | −1 | 39 | |
| 16 | Rhyl | 42 | 15 | 8 | 19 | 53 | 60 | −7 | 38 | |
| 17 | Ashton United | 42 | 13 | 5 | 24 | 63 | 94 | −31 | 31 | |
| 18 | New Mills | 42 | 9 | 11 | 22 | 58 | 82 | −24 | 29 | |
| 19 | Rossendale United | 42 | 11 | 6 | 25 | 51 | 108 | −57 | 28 | |
| 20 | Radcliffe Borough | 42 | 4 | 7 | 31 | 37 | 115 | −78 | 15 | |
| 21 | New Brighton (R) | 42 | 3 | 5 | 34 | 36 | 115 | −79 | 11 | Relegation to Division Two |
| 22 | Middlewich Athletic (R) | 42 | 3 | 4 | 35 | 43 | 120 | −77 | 10 | Relegation to Division Two |

Rules for classification: 1) points; 2) goal difference; 3) number of goals scored.
The points system until the 1990–91 season: 2 points for a win, 1 point for a draw and 0 points for losing.
(C) Champions; (P) Promoted; (R) Relegated

== Division Two ==
Cheshire County Football League Division Two
- Season: 1978–79
- Champions: Bootle
- Promoted: Bootle; Curzon Ashton

The division featured 18 new teams:

- Accrington Stanley, from Lancashire Combination
- Anson Villa, from Manchester League Premier Division
- Ashton Town, from Lancashire Combination
- Atherton Collieries, from Lancashire Combination
- Bootle, from Lancashire Combination
- Congleton Town, from Mid-Cheshire League Division One
- Curzon Ashton, from Manchester League Premier Division
- Eastwood Hanley, from West Midlands (Regional) League Premier Division
- Ford Motors, from Lancashire Combination
- Glossop, from Manchester League Premier Division
- Irlam Town, from Manchester League Premier Division
- Kirkby Town, from Lancashire Combination
- Maghull, from Lancashire Combination
- Prescot BI, from Liverpool County Combination
- Prescot Town, from Mid-Cheshire League Division One
- Prestwich Heys, relegated from the previous season's Cheshire County League
- Skelmersdale United, from Lancashire Combination
- Warrington Town, from Mid-Cheshire League Division One

=== League table ===
| Pos | Team | Pld | W | D | L | GF | GA | GD | Pts | Promotion |
|---|---|---|---|---|---|---|---|---|---|---|
| 1 | Bootle (C, P) | 34 | 19 | 9 | 6 | 61 | 35 | +26 | 47 | Promotion to Division One |
| 2 | Curzon Ashton (P) | 34 | 18 | 9 | 7 | 57 | 32 | +25 | 45 | Promotion to Division One |
| 3 | Prescot Town | 34 | 20 | 5 | 9 | 68 | 37 | +31 | 43 (Note: Deducted 2 points) | |
| 4 | Kirkby Town | 34 | 18 | 6 | 10 | 66 | 42 | +24 | 42 | |
| 5 | Accrington Stanley | 34 | 18 | 6 | 10 | 65 | 43 | +22 | 42 | |
| 6 | Irlam Town | 34 | 16 | 10 | 8 | 47 | 33 | +14 | 42 | |
| 7 | Congleton Town | 34 | 14 | 13 | 7 | 52 | 31 | +21 | 41 | |
| 8 | Prescot BI | 34 | 15 | 11 | 8 | 55 | 42 | +13 | 41 | |
| 9 | Eastwood Hanley | 34 | 15 | 9 | 10 | 60 | 47 | +13 | 39 | |
| 10 | Prestwich Heys | 34 | 17 | 5 | 12 | 53 | 41 | +12 | 37 | |
| 11 | Maghull | 34 | 11 | 7 | 16 | 41 | 50 | −9 | 29 | |
| 12 | Ford Motors | 34 | 9 | 10 | 15 | 38 | 52 | −14 | 28 | |
| 13 | Anson Villa | 34 | 10 | 7 | 17 | 39 | 60 | −21 | 27 | |
| 14 | Warrington Town | 34 | 11 | 5 | 18 | 45 | 69 | −24 | 27 | |
| 15 | Atherton Collieries | 34 | 8 | 9 | 17 | 43 | 56 | −13 | 25 | |
| 16 | Skelmersdale United | 34 | 9 | 6 | 19 | 36 | 53 | −17 | 24 | |
| 17 | Glossop | 34 | 6 | 6 | 22 | 42 | 83 | −41 | 18 | |
| 18 | Ashton Town | 34 | 3 | 5 | 26 | 22 | 84 | −62 | 11 | |

Rules for classification: 1) points; 2) goal difference; 3) number of goals scored.
The points system until the 1990–91 season: 2 points for a win, 1 point for a draw and 0 points for losing.
(C) Champions; (P) Promoted
