= Maurice Daly (footballer) =

Irish former professional footballer

Personal information
- Date of birth: 28 November 1955 (age 70)
- Place of birth: Dublin, Ireland
- Position: Defender

Youth career
- 1972–1973: Home Farm

Senior career*
Years	Team	Apps	(Gls)
1973–1978	Wolverhampton Wanderers	32	(0)
1979–1986	IFK Västerås	145	(2)

International career
1978	Republic of Ireland	2	(0)
- * Club domestic league appearances and goals

Maurice Celsus Daly (born 28 November 1955) is an Irish former professional footballer who played twice for the Republic of Ireland. Both his international appearances came in April 1978 in friendlies against Poland and Turkey under the management of Johnny Giles.

He was also capped four times for the Republic of Ireland national under-21 football team.

He was a left sided defender or midfielder who in his club career played for Home Farm, Wolverhampton and IFK Västerås (not to be mixed up with Västerås SK).

Signed as a professional for Wolverhampton in July 1973, having joined the club as a 17-year-old from famed Dublin schoolboy club Home Farm, Daly spent five years at Wolverhampton before moving to Swedish second-tier side IFK Västerås at the invitation of former Wolverhampton boss Sammy Chung.

Seven seasons later, he was appointed part-time coach of third division club Skultuna.

== Bibliography ==
- Dean Hayes, Ireland's Greatest (Appletree Press, 2006) ISBN 0 86281 995 4 ISBN 978 0 86281 995 8
