= 1978–79 Southern Football League =

The 1978–79 Southern Football League season was the 76th in the history of the league, an English football competition.

Worcester City won the championship, winning their first Southern League title. At the end of the season the Alliance Premier League was established as a new, national top division of non-League football. Thirteen clubs from the Premier Division joined the new league, leading to a restructuring of the Southern League for the next season, in which it was divided solely into Midland and Southern divisions.

Due to the forthcoming changes, there was no relegation or promotion between the Southern League's divisions, although the Premier Division clubs that remained in the Southern League had effectively been relegated one level, being placed in the Midland or Southern divisions the following season. Several clubs left the Division One North at the end of the season to join the Northern Premier League, which had also lost clubs to the new Alliance Premier League, whilst Premier Division club Atherstone Town folded.

== Premier Division ==
The Premier Division consisted of 22 clubs, including 18 clubs from the previous season and four new clubs:

- Two clubs promoted from Division One North:
  - Bridgend Town
  - Witney Town
- Two clubs promoted from Division One South:
  - Dorchester Town
  - Margate

At the end of the season most of the Premier Division clubs left the league to join newly created Alliance Premier League. Atherstone Town folded at the end of the season. The rest of the clubs were distributed between newly created Midland and Southern divisions.

=== League table ===
Southern Football League Premier Division
- Season: 1978–79
- Champions: Worcester City
- Matches: 462
- Goals: 1,251 (2.71 per match)

Pos	Team	Pld	W	D	L	GF	GA	GD	Pts	Promotion or relegation
1	Worcester City	42	27	11	4	92	33	+59	65	Promoted to the Alliance Premier League
2	Kettering Town	42	27	7	8	109	43	+66	61	Promoted to the Alliance Premier League
3	Telford United	42	22	10	10	60	39	+21	54	Promoted to the Alliance Premier League
4	Maidstone United	42	18	18	6	55	35	+20	54	Promoted to the Alliance Premier League
5	Bath City	42	17	19	6	59	41	+18	53	Promoted to the Alliance Premier League
6	Weymouth	42	18	15	9	71	51	+20	51	Promoted to the Alliance Premier League
7	AP Leamington	42	19	11	12	65	53	+12	49	Promoted to the Alliance Premier League
8	Redditch United	42	19	10	13	70	57	+13	48	Promoted to the Alliance Premier League
9	Yeovil Town	42	15	16	11	59	49	+10	46	Promoted to the Alliance Premier League
10	Witney Town	42	17	10	15	53	52	+1	44	Placed to the Midland Division
11	Nuneaton Borough	42	13	17	12	59	50	+9	43	Promoted to the Alliance Premier League
12	Gravesend & Northfleet	42	15	12	15	56	55	+1	42	Promoted to the Alliance Premier League
13	Barnet	42	16	10	16	52	64	−12	42	Promoted to the Alliance Premier League
14	Hillingdon Borough	42	12	16	14	50	41	+9	40	Placed to the Southern Division
15	Wealdstone	42	12	12	18	51	59	−8	36	Promoted to the Alliance Premier League
16	Atherstone Town	42	9	17	16	46	65	−19	35	Club folded
17	Dartford	42	10	14	18	40	56	−16	34	Placed to the Southern Division
18	Cheltenham Town	42	11	10	21	38	72	−34	32	Placed to the Midland Division
19	Margate	42	10	9	23	44	75	−31	29	Placed to the Southern Division
20	Dorchester Town	42	7	11	24	46	86	−40	25	Placed to the Southern Division
21	Hastings United	42	5	13	24	37	85	−48	23	Placed to the Southern Division
22	Bridgend Town	42	6	6	30	39	90	−51	18	Placed to the Midland Division

Source: fchd.com rsssf.com
Rules for classification: 1) points; 2) goal difference; 3) number of goals scored.

== Division One North ==
Division One North consisted of 20 clubs, including 17 clubs from the previous season and three new clubs:

- Alvechurch, joined from the West Midlands (Regional) League
- Bedford Town, relegated from the Premier Division
- Grantham, relegated from the Premier Division

At the end of the season Alliance Premier League on the top of non-league was created. Following that Southern Football League was restructured with Midland and Southern divisions replacing three old divisions. Most of the Division One North clubs were placed to the Midland Division.

=== League table ===
Southern Football League Division One North
- Season: 1978–79
- Champions: Grantham
- Matches: 380
- Goals: 1,109 (2.92 per match)

Pos	Team	Pld	W	D	L	GF	GA	GD	Pts	Promotion or relegation
1	Grantham	38	21	10	7	70	45	+25	52	Promoted and transferred to the Northern Premier League
2	Merthyr Tydfil	38	22	7	9	90	53	+37	51	
3	Alvechurch	38	20	10	8	70	42	+28	50	
4	Bedford Town	38	19	9	10	74	49	+25	47	
5	King's Lynn	38	17	11	10	57	46	+11	45	
6	Oswestry Town	38	18	8	12	63	43	+20	44	Promoted and transferred to the Northern Premier League
7	Gloucester City	38	18	8	12	76	59	+17	44	
8	Burton Albion	38	16	10	12	51	40	+11	42	Promoted and transferred to the Northern Premier League
9	Kidderminster Harriers	38	13	14	11	70	60	+10	40	
10	Bedworth United	38	13	14	11	41	34	+7	40	
11	Tamworth	38	15	8	15	47	45	+2	38	Promoted and transferred to the Northern Premier League
12	Stourbridge	38	15	7	16	64	61	+3	37	
13	Barry Town	38	14	9	15	51	53	−2	37	
14	Enderby Town	38	14	8	16	46	55	−9	36	
15	Banbury United	38	10	13	15	42	58	−16	33	
16	Wellingborough Town	38	13	6	19	50	71	−21	32	
17	Cambridge City	38	9	9	20	37	62	−25	27	
18	Bromsgrove Rovers	38	6	14	18	33	61	−28	26	
19	Milton Keynes City	38	7	9	22	37	87	−50	23	
20	Corby Town	38	5	6	27	40	85	−45	16	

Source: fchd.com rsssf.com
Rules for classification: 1) points; 2) goal difference; 3) number of goals scored.

== Division One South ==
Division One South expanded up to 21 clubs, including 17 clubs from the previous season and four new clubs:

- Dover, relegated from the Premier Division
- Dunstable, transferred from the Southern League Division One North
- Gosport Borough, promoted from the Hampshire League
- Minehead, relegated from the Premier Division

At the end of the season Alliance Premier League on the top of non-league was created. Following that Southern Football League was restructured with Midland and Southern divisions replacing three old divisions. Most of the Division One South clubs were placed to the Southern Division.

=== League table ===
Southern Football League Division One South
- Season: 1978–79
- Champions: Dover
- Matches: 420
- Goals: 1,145 (2.73 per match)

Pos	Team	Pld	W	D	L	GF	GA	GD	Pts	Promotion or relegation
1	Dover	40	28	9	3	88	20	+68	65	
2	Folkestone & Shepway	40	22	6	12	84	50	+34	50	
3	Gosport Borough	40	19	11	10	62	47	+15	49	
4	Chelmsford City	40	20	7	13	65	61	+4	47	
5	Minehead	40	16	13	11	58	39	+19	45	Placed to the Midland Division
6	Poole Town	40	15	15	10	48	44	+4	45	
7	Hounslow	40	16	12	12	56	45	+11	44	
8	Waterlooville	40	17	10	13	52	43	+9	44	
9	Trowbridge Town	40	15	12	13	65	61	+4	42	Placed to the Midland Division
10	Aylesbury United	40	16	9	15	54	52	+2	41	
11	Taunton Town	40	16	9	15	53	51	+2	41	Placed to the Midland Division
12	Bognor Regis Town	40	17	7	16	58	58	0	41	
13	Dunstable	40	18	4	18	57	55	+2	40	
14	Tonbridge Angels	40	15	10	15	43	47	−4	40	
15	Salisbury	40	13	10	17	47	51	−4	36	
16	Basingstoke Town	40	12	11	17	49	62	−13	35	
17	Addlestone	40	12	9	19	56	64	−8	33	
18	Andover	40	12	6	22	47	69	−22	30	
19	Ashford Town (Kent)	40	10	10	20	28	53	−25	30	
20	Crawley Town	40	9	9	22	44	75	−31	27	
21	Canterbury City	40	6	3	31	31	98	−67	15	

Source: fchd.com rsssf.com
Rules for classification: 1) points; 2) goal difference; 3) number of goals scored.

== Football League election ==
Runners-up Kettering Town were the only Southern League club to apply for election to the Football League. However, all four Football League clubs were re-elected.

Club	League	Votes
Doncaster Rovers	Football League Division Four	50
Crewe Alexandra	Football League Division Four	49
Darlington	Football League Division Four	43
Halifax Town	Football League Division Four	37
Altrincham	Northern Premier League	13
Kettering Town	Southern League	12

== See also ==
- Southern Football League
- 1978–79 Northern Premier League
