= Gerry O'Hara (footballer) =

English footballer

Personal information
- Full name: Gerald John O'Hara
- Date of birth: 3 December 1956 (age 69)
- Place of birth: Wolverhampton, England
- Position: Midfielder

Senior career*
Years	Team	Apps	(Gls)
1974–1978	Wolverhampton Wanderers	9	(0)
1978–1979	Hereford United	1	(0)
1979–1982	Worcester City	41	(11)
- * Club domestic league appearances and goals

Gerald John O'Hara (born 3 December 1956) is an English former professional footballer who played in the Football League, as a midfielder.
