= Mossley A.F.C. =

English football club in Greater Manchester

Coordinates: 53°30′59.029″N 2°2′39.592″W

- Full name: Mossley Association Football Club
- Nickname: The Lilywhites
- Founded: 1903
- Ground: Seel Park, Mossley
- Capacity: 4,500 (200 seated)
- Chairman: Stephen Porter
- Manager: Alex Craddock
- League: Northern Premier League Division One West
- 2025–26: Northern Premier League Division One West, 11th of 22
- Website: mossleyafc.co.uk
Home colours	Away colours

Mossley Association Football Club is a football club in Mossley, Greater Manchester, England. Nicknamed the Lilywhites after the white shirts adopted in 1912, they are currently members of the Northern Premier League Division One West and play at Seel Park.

== History ==
The club was established as Park Villa. After a season of playing friendlies and cup matches, they were renamed Mossley Juniors in 1904 and joined the Stalybridge & District League. In their first competitive league match the club lost 9–1 to Dunham Villa, but they recovered to beat Mossley Volunteers 2–1 the following week. The club transferred to the Ashton, Dunkinfield & District League in 1907, and then the Oldham & District League in 1907 and the West End Amateur League in 1908. In 1909 they were renamed Mossley Association Football Club and joined Division Two of the Ashton & District League. They finished joint top of the table in 1909–10 before losing a championship play-off match 3–2 to Ashton St Peter's reserves. However, they did win the Ashton Junior Cup. The league was reduced to a single division the following season, with Mossley continuing as members. They won the league in 1911–12 and were runners-up in the next two seasons, also winning the Lady Aitken League Cup in 1913–14, beating Droylsden in a second replay.

Mossley were Ashton & District League champions again in 1914–15, also winning the League Cup and the Manchester Junior Cup. In 1915 they joined the South East Lancashire League. However, despite leading the league in January, club officials decided to disband due to the war. They reformed for the 1916–17 and joined the Manchester Amateur League, but disbanded again in January 1917. The club was resurrected again in December 1918 and joined the Manchester Section of the Lancashire Combination for the truncated 1919 season, going on to finish as runners-up. Later in 1919 Mossley were founder members of the Cheshire County League, finishing as runners-up in the league and losing the League Cup final in the 1919–20 season. They won the League Cup the following season. In 1933–34 the club won the Manchester Junior Cup for a second time. They subsequently won Manchester Shield in 1937–38.

Following World War II Mossley finished bottom of the league in 1945–46. The 1949–50 season saw the club reach the first round of the FA Cup for the first time. After beating Witton Albion 1–0, they lost 3–0 to Nuneaton Borough in a second round replay. In 1960–61 the club won the League Cup and the Manchester Intermediate Cup, winning the latter trophy again in 1966–67 and 1967–68. They reached the first round of the FA Cup again in 1969–70, losing 1–0 to Stockport County in a replay, before going on to finish as runners-up in the league. After winning the Manchester Senior Cup in 1971–72, they moved up to the Northern Premier League. The club won the Senior Cup for a second time in 1976–77. Another appearance in the FA Cup first round in 1977–78 saw them lose 3–0 to Rotherham United. However, the season ended with the club winning the Northern Premier League title and the League Cup. However, they were unable to be promoted to the Alliance Premier League as their ground did not meet the requirements. The club were subsequently invited to play in a Non League Champion of Champions Cup match at the start of the following season, but were beaten by Southern League champions Worcester City over two legs.

Mossley retained their league title in 1979–80. They also reached the FA Cup first round again, losing 5–2 to York City, as well as reaching the final of the FA Trophy, in which they were beaten 2–1 by Dagenham at Wembley Stadium. The club defeated Football League opposition in the FA Cup for the first time the following season, beating Crewe Alexandra 1–0 before losing 3–1 at home to Mansfield Town in the second round. They went on to finish as runners-up in the league, which they repeated in each of the next two seasons, as well as making further FA Cup first round appearances which ended in defeat by Stockport and Huddersfield Town. Although the club reached the FA Cup first round again in 1983–84 (losing to 5–0 Darlington), they also finished bottom of the Northern Premier League, marking the end of their period of success.

The Northern Premier League gained a second division in 1987, with Mossley becoming members of the Premier Division. They won the League Cup and the Manchester Premier Cup in 1988–89, before winning the league's Challenge Shield in 1989–90 and the Manchester Premier Cup in 1990–91. However, the club were relegated to Division One at the end of the 1992–93 season, and then finished bottom of Division One in 1994–95, resulting in relegation to Division One of the North West Counties League (which had been formed by merger of the Cheshire County League and the Lancashire Combination in 1982). They were Division One runners-up in 1998–99 and won the League Cup in 2002–03, before finishing as runners-up in Division One again the following season, earning promotion back to Division One of the Northern Premier League.

Mossley were Division One champions in 2005–06 and were promoted to the Premier Division. However, they were relegated at the end of the following season, at which point the club were placed in Division One North. The club won the Manchester Premier Cup in 2011–12, and retained it the following season, which also saw the club finish fifth in the league, qualifying for the promotion play-offs. However, they were beaten 1–0 by Cammell Laird in the semi-finals. The club won the Premier Cup again in 2014–15 and 2015–16.

== Ground ==
The club initially played at a former rugby ground in Luzley, earning the nickname the 'Luzleyites'. Seats were installed on the eastern side of the pitch and some at the southern end. In 1912 they moved to Seel Fold, which had previously been used as a rubbish tip and then a cricket field, using the adjacent Highland Laddie Hotel as their headquarters. The opening match was played on 23 September, a 4–0 win for Mossley against Stalybridge St Peters in the Ashton & District League. A record attendance of over 3,000 was set for a local derby against Mossley Celtic in the 1913–14 season. A 430-capacity stand was built on the Popular Side in 1920, with terracing installed on the same side in 1922. The stand was expanded to a capacity of 1,000 in 1927, with the ground becoming known as Seel Park in 1931. A new stand was built at the Mossley Park end in 1932 and a 300-seat stand erected on the Market Street side of the pitch four years later. The club's record attendance of 6,640 was set in 1946 for a Cheshire County League match against local rivals Stalybridge Celtic.

Mossley purchased the ground from Stamford Estates in 1948 for £1,200. The Popular Side stand was demolished in 1969 and replaced in 1971 when the club sold Gary Pierce to Huddersfield Town. Floodlights were installed the following year. A stand was built at the Park End in 1980. In 1987 the main stand had to be demolished due to storm damage, and was replaced with a 220-seat stand which was named for club president James Anderson. The ground was sold in 1988 to clear the club's debts, with Tameside Metropolitan Borough Council becoming owners in 1990. The installation of new terracing began in 1996 and finished in 2008 when the Hanover Street side was completed.

== Current squad ==
As of 26 August 2026

Note: Flags indicate national team as defined under FIFA eligibility rules; some limited exceptions apply. Players may hold more than one non-FIFA nationality.

No.	Pos.	Nation	Player
—	GK	ENG	Paul Day
—	GK	ENG	Fin Madigan
—	DF	ENG	Jack Grundy
—	DF	ENG	Joe Hillary
—	DF	ENG	Matt Kardacz
—	DF	ENG	Mark Lees
—	DF	ENG	Jack Marrow
—	DF	ENG	Harry Olufowobi
—	MF	WAL	Joe Adams

No.	Pos.	Nation	Player
—	MF	ENG	Joe Berks
—	MF	ENG	Sean Kgwakgwa
—	MF	ENG	Connor Marsh
—	MF	IRL	Callum Stringer
—	FW	ENG	Charlie Bingley
—	FW	ENG	Mason Fawns
—	FW	ENG	Charlie Frost
—	FW	ENG	Reece Webb-Foster

== Honours ==
- Northern Premier League
  - Champions 1978–79, 1979–80
  - Division One champions 2005–06
  - Challenge Cup winners 1978–79, 1988–89
  - Challenge Shield winners 1989–90
- North West Counties League
  - League Cup winners 2002–03
- Cheshire County League
  - League Cup winners 1920–21, 1960–61
- Ashton & District League
  - Champions 1911–12, 1914–15
  - League Cup winners 1913–14
- Manchester Premier Cup
  - Winners 1988–89, 1990–91, 2011–12, 2012–13, 2014–15, 2015–16
- Manchester Senior Cup
  - Winners 1971–72, 1976–77
- Manchester Shield
  - Winners 1937–38
- Manchester Intermediate Cup
  - Winners 1960–61, 1966–67, 1967–68
- Manchester Junior Cup
  - Winners 1914–15, 1933–34
- Ashton Challenge Cup
  - Winners 1921–22, 1922–23, 1929–30, 1934–35, 1948–49, 1951–52, 1953–54, 1955–56, 1961–62
- Ashton Junior Cup
  - Winners 1909–10

== Records ==
- Best FA Cup performance: Second round, 1949–50, 1980–81
- Best FA Trophy performance: Finalists, 1979–80
- Best FA Vase performance: Quarter-finals, 1996–97, 1999–2000, 2002–03
- Record attendance: 6,640 vs Stalybridge Celtic, Cheshire County League, 1946
- Biggest win: 9–0 vs Urmston, Manchester Shield, 1947
- Heaviest defeat: 13–2 vs Witton Albion, Cheshire County League, 1926
- Most appearances: Jimmy O'Connor, 613 (1972–1987)
- Most goals: David Moore, 234 (1974–1983)
- Most goals in a season: Jackie Roscoe, 58 (1930–31)
- Record transfer fee received: £25,000 from Everton for Eamonn O'Keefe, 1979
- Record transfer fee paid: £2,300 to Altrincham for Phil Wilson, 1980

== See also ==
- Mossley A.F.C. players
- Mossley A.F.C. managers
