= Steve Daley =

English footballer (born 1953)

Personal information
- Full name: Stephen Daley
- Date of birth: 15 April 1953 (age 73)
- Place of birth: Barnsley, England
- Position: Midfielder

Youth career
- Wath Wanderers

Senior career*
Years	Team	Apps	(Gls)
1971–1979	Wolverhampton Wanderers	212	(38)
1979–1981	Manchester City	48	(4)
1981–1983	Seattle Sounders	87	(23)
1981–1982	Seattle Sounders (indoor)	18	(13)
1983–1984	Burnley	23	(4)
1984	San Diego Sockers	19	(3)
1984–1985	San Diego Sockers (indoor)	38	(4)
1985–1986	Walsall	28	(1)
Total		455	(77)

International career
1971	England Youth	6	(1)
1978	England B	6	(2)

Managerial career
- Telford United
- Bromsgrove Rovers
- 2001–2002: Bilston Town
- * Club domestic league appearances and goals

Steve Daley (born 15 April 1953) is an English former footballer, who played as a midfielder. His English record transfer to Manchester City in 1979 was later described as "the biggest waste of money in football history". The Manchester City manager Malcolm Allison and chairman Peter Swales subsequently accused each other of inflating the fee.

== Career ==
=== Wolverhampton Wanderers ===
Daley began his football career as an apprentice at Wolverhampton Wanderers, after arriving at the club via their feeder team Wath Wanderers based in Yorkshire. He signed professionally in 1971, and made his first-team debut later that year on 18 September, coming on as substitute in a 2–0 defeat at Newcastle United.

He won a League Cup winners medal with the club in 1974 and played in their run through to the 1972 UEFA Cup Final, scoring a vital goal in the semi-final against Ferencváros inside the first minute. That goal still holds the record for being the fastest goal ever scored in European football cup competitions. He was an ever-present in the 1976–77 season, scoring 13 goals, and a further eight the following season saw him receive an England 'B' call up. He played six times for the 'B' side during 1978, scoring twice (against Singapore and Czechoslovakia 'B').

=== Manchester City ===
In September 1979, he was transferred to Manchester City for a fee of £1,437,500 – an English record, and equivalent to £7,077,897 in 2025. Daley struggled at Maine Road, and gained a reputation as a big-money misfit.

=== After Manchester City ===
Twenty months later he was transferred to the Seattle Sounders of the North American Soccer League for £300,000 – little more than a fifth of his original transfer cost. He made the NASL All-Star second team in 1982 and 1983 before moving back to Britain.

Daley joined Burnley, but soon returned to North America to play for the San Diego Sockers. His professional playing career ended at Walsall in 1986, although he continued to turn out for non-league sides such as Lye Town and Kettering Town.

After hanging up his boots, Daley briefly managed non-league Telford United, Bromsgrove Rovers, Bilston Town and Lye Town before quitting football to join the pub trade. He has since been working as a brewery sales manager, supplying catering equipment to the industry. Also an established after-dinner speaker, Daley recalls his career in football with honesty and humour.
