= 1979–80 Alliance Premier League =

Alliance Premier League
- Season: 1979–80
- Champions: Altrincham
- Promoted to the Football League: None
- Runners-up: Weymouth
- Relegated to Level 6: Redditch United
- Promoted for next season: Frickley Athletic
- Matches: 380
- Goals: 972 (2.56 per match)
- Top goalscorer: G. J. Smith Northwich Victoria (29 goals) (Note: G. J. Smith's goals include also goals scored in the League Cup.)
- Biggest home win: Maidstone United 6–0 Bath City
- Biggest away win: Redditch United 1–5 Bangor City; Stafford Rangers 1–5 Weymouth
- Highest scoring: Northwich Victoria 6–3 Barrow; Kettering Town 3–6 Stafford Rangers

The 1979–80 Alliance Premier League was the inaugural season of the Alliance Premier League – the first league outside the Football League to cover the whole of England.

== Overview ==
Between 1979 and 2004 the single-division Alliance Premier League formed Level 5 of the English football league system. Since 2004 two regional divisions were added at Level 6.

The founder members of the Alliance Premier League were drawn from the Southern League and Northern Premier League, covering the country from Yeovil Town in the South West to Barrow in the far North. One club from Wales – Bangor City – also participated.

== Teams ==
From the Northern Premier League

- Altrincham
- Bangor City
- Barrow
- Boston United
- Northwich Victoria
- Scarborough
- Stafford Rangers

From the Southern League

- AP Leamington
- Barnet
- Bath City
- Gravesend & Northfleet
- Kettering Town
- Maidstone United
- Nuneaton Borough
- Redditch United
- Telford United
- Wealdstone
- Weymouth
- Worcester City
- Yeovil Town

== League table ==
Pos	Team	Pld	W	D	L	GF	GA	GD	Pts	Qualification or relegation
1	Altrincham (C)	38	24	8	6	79	35	+44	56	
2	Weymouth	38	22	10	6	73	37	+36	54	
3	Worcester City	38	19	11	8	53	36	+17	49	
4	Boston United	38	16	13	9	52	43	+9	45	
5	Gravesend & Northfleet	38	17	10	11	49	44	+5	44	
6	Maidstone United	38	16	11	11	54	37	+17	43	
7	Kettering Town	38	15	13	10	55	50	+5	43	
8	Northwich Victoria	38	16	10	12	50	38	+12	42	
9	Bangor City	38	14	14	10	41	46	−5	42	
10	Nuneaton Borough	38	13	13	12	58	44	+14	39	
11	Scarborough	38	12	15	11	47	38	+9	39	
12	Yeovil Town	38	13	10	15	46	49	−3	36	
13	Telford United	38	13	8	17	52	60	−8	34	
14	Barrow	38	14	6	18	47	55	−8	34	
15	Wealdstone	38	9	15	14	42	54	−12	33	
16	Bath City	38	10	12	16	43	69	−26	32	
17	Barnet	38	10	10	18	32	48	−16	30	
18	AP Leamington	38	7	11	20	32	63	−31	25	
19	Stafford Rangers	38	6	10	22	41	57	−16	22	
20	Redditch United (R)	38	5	8	25	26	69	−43	18	Relegation to the Southern League Midland Division

(C) Champions; (R) Relegated

== Results ==
Home \ Away	ALT	APL	BAN	BAR	BRW	BAT	BOS	GRN	KET	MDS	NOR	NUN	RED	SCA	STA	TEL	WEA	WEY	WRC	YEO
Altrincham		3–0	5–0	1–0	3–1	4–0	3–0	4–1	0–0	1–0	0–0	3–1	2–0	2–0	3–1	2–0	2–1	3–2	3–1	1–1
AP Leamington	1–4		1–1	2–1	0–1	1–2	2–0	0–1	1–3	0–2	2–2	0–0	0–2	1–1	2–0	2–1	0–0	0–2	1–0	0–4
Bangor City	1–1	3–2		1–1	1–1	2–1	2–0	1–2	1–1	1–0	0–3	1–0	1–0	1–0	1–1	1–1	1–0	1–2	0–2	1–0
Barnet	2–0	1–0	1–1		1–1	1–0	0–0	3–0	0–2	0–1	0–2	2–1	0–0	0–0	2–1	4–1	1–3	0–2	0–0	0–3
Barrow	1–3	6–2	1–1	3–1		2–1	0–1	1–1	1–2	0–2	1–0	1–0	2–0	0–0	2–1	2–0	1–0	0–1	1–2	2–0
Bath City	1–1	0–0	2–1	1–2	1–0		0–1	2–0	3–0	1–1	0–0	1–1	1–1	1–0	2–1	1–1	4–4	4–2	0–4	1–1
Boston United	2–5	2–0	3–1	1–1	3–0	3–2		4–0	1–0	1–1	2–0	2–2	2–0	2–2	3–2	3–1	0–0	2–2	1–1	3–0
Gravesend & Northfleet	0–2	3–2	1–1	1–0	5–1	2–0	0–0		2–2	1–0	2–1	2–2	1–0	3–0	2–0	1–2	3–0	2–3	3–2	2–0
Kettering Town	1–2	1–1	0–1	1–0	0–4	1–2	3–1	0–0		1–1	1–0	1–1	2–1	1–0	3–6	3–2	2–0	3–1	0–0	5–3
Maidstone United	2–2	0–0	0–1	2–0	2–0	6–0	1–0	3–0	1–3		3–4	1–1	4–1	2–0	2–0	3–0	3–0	1–1	2–1	0–1
Northwich Victoria	1–0	2–1	4–0	2–0	6–3	6–1	0–1	0–0	2–2	0–2		2–1	1–0	1–1	1–0	2–1	0–0	0–0	1–0	0–1
Nuneaton Borough	2–0	1–1	2–2	2–1	3–0	1–1	2–0	3–1	2–2	4–0	2–1		5–1	3–1	3–1	1–1	0–1	1–2	1–0	3–0
Redditch United	0–1	3–1	1–5	1–0	1–3	1–1	0–2	0–2	0–1	0–0	0–1	1–0		1–2	0–2	2–2	4–1	0–2	1–1	2–2
Scarborough	1–1	5–0	0–0	0–0	2–0	6–1	2–4	1–1	2–0	1–2	2–1	2–1	3–0		0–0	1–2	0–0	0–0	4–1	0–0
Stafford Rangers	1–2	1–1	0–1	1–2	1–1	4–0	0–0	0–1	0–0	1–1	4–1	0–1	1–1	3–1		0–1	0–1	1–5	0–0	2–1
Telford United	3–2	0–1	2–0	1–2	3–2	3–1	4–1	1–2	1–0	3–1	0–0	2–1	2–1	0–1	2–2		1–3	3–3	0–1	0–3
Wealdstone	1–4	1–2	0–0	2–1	2–1	1–1	1–1	0–0	2–2	0–0	0–1	2–2	2–0	2–4	2–1	0–0		1–1	2–4	5–0
Weymouth	0–0	2–1	4–2	1–1	1–0	1–2	3–0	1–0	3–1	1–1	2–0	2–0	6–0	0–1	2–1	3–2	4–0		1–2	3–0
Worcester City	3–2	1–1	0–0	2–1	2–0	2–1	0–0	1–0	1–4	3–1	2–1	1–1	3–0	0–0	1–0	2–1	2–1	1–1		2–0
Yeovil Town	3–2	1–0	1–2	5–0	0–1	1–0	0–0	1–1	1–1	3–0	1–1	2–1	2–0	1–1	3–1	0–2	1–1	0–1	0–2	

Updated to match(es) played on unknown. Source: Rothmans Football Yearbook 1980–81. Queen Anne Press, Macdonald Futura Publishers, London & Sydney, 1981.
Legend: Blue = home team win; Yellow = draw; Red = away team win.
Locations of the 1979–80 Alliance Premier League clubs
Locations of the 1979–80 Alliance Premier League London clubs

== Promotion and relegation ==
=== Promoted ===
- Frickley Athletic (from the Northern Premier League)

=== Relegated ===
- Redditch United (to the Southern League Midland Division)

== Top scorers ==
Rank	Player	Club	League	FA Cup	FA Trophy	League Cup	Total (Note: The number of goals is the sum of league and league cup goals.)
1	(England) G. J. Smith	Northwich Victoria					29
2	(England) Tommy Paterson	Weymouth					28
3	(England) John Rogers	Altrincham					24
4	(England) Aniello Iannone	Weymouth					22
5	(England) J. P. Daubney	Maidstone United					21
6	(England) Barry Whitbread	Altrincham					20
7	(England) Bobby Brown	Boston United					19
8	(England) R. O. Gauden	Scarborough					16
=	(England) David Mather	Telford United					16
10	(England) Roy Clayton	Kettering Town					14
11	(England) M. J. Neale	Nuneaton Borough					13
=	(England) M. C. Wheeler	Bath City					13
13	(England) Colin Cowperthwaite	Barrow					12
=	(England) J. N. Evans	Kettering Town					12
=	(England) D. Gardner	AP Leamington					12
=	(England) Gerry O'Hara	Worcester City					12
17	(England) Neil Cordice	Wealdstone					11
=	(England) Barry Howard	Altrincham					11
=	(England) N. B. Johnson	Wealdstone					11
=	(England) M. D. Phelps	Worcester City					11
=	(England) P. Phipps	Kettering Town					11
=	(England) P. T. Wilkey	Telford United					11

== Election to the Football League ==
As winners of the Alliance Premier League, Altrincham won the right to apply for election to the Football League to replace one of the four bottom teams in the 1979–80 Football League Fourth Division. The vote went as follows:

Club	Final Position	Votes
Darlington	22nd (Fourth Division)	49
Crewe Alexandra	23rd (Fourth Division)	48
Hereford United	21st (Fourth Division)	48
Rochdale	24th (Fourth Division)	26
Altrincham	1st (Alliance Premier League)	25

As a result of this, Altrincham failed to be elected to membership of the Football League, falling just one point behind Fourth Division's bottom club Rochdale.
