= List of Leicester City F.C. players =

This is a list of notable footballers who have played for Leicester City, although it includes players who were with the club when it was called Leicester Fosse (foundation in 1884 to 1919). The aim is for this list to include all players that have played 100 or more senior matches and/or scored 50 or more senior goals for the club. Other players who have played an important role for the club can also be included, but the reason for their notability should be included in the 'Notes' column. For a list of all Leicester City players, major or minor, with a Wikipedia article, see Category:Leicester City F.C. players, and for the current squad see the main Leicester City F.C. article.

== Explanation of list ==
Players should be listed in chronological order according to the year in which they first played for the club, and then by alphabetical order of their surname. Appearances and goals should include substitute appearances, but exclude wartime matches and games played in the Texaco Cup, Anglo-Scottish Cup, Anglo-Italian Cup, and FA Cup third place play-off. Further information on competitions/seasons which are regarded as eligible for appearance stats are provided below (dependent on the years at which the player was at the club), and if any data is not available for any of these competitions an appropriate note should be added to the table.

== List of players ==
- Statistics correct as of 20 October 2026.

This and the † indicate that they are a club record holder
This indicates that they played their full career at Leicester City.
Italics This indicates they received international honours while not at the club.
(n/a) = Information not available
Players in bold are still playing for the club.

| Name | Nat. | Position | Period | League | | Total | | International honours | Caps | Notes |
| Name | Nat. | Position | Period | Apps | Goals | Apps | Goals | International honours | Caps | Notes |
|---|---|---|---|---|---|---|---|---|---|---|
| Harry Bailey | (England) | Full-back | 1884–1889 | 108 | 0 | 125 | 0 | | | † |
| Jack Lord | (England) | Wing-half | 1891–1898 | 85 | 5 | 101 | 7 | | | |
| James Thraves | (England) | Goalkeeper | 1892–1897 | 124 | 0 | 148 | 0 | | | |
| Jimmy Brown | (Scotland) | Wing-half | 1893–1899 | 130 | 18 | 153 | 21 | | | |
| Johnny McMillan | (Scotland) | Inside forward | 1896–1900 | 122 | 43 | 131 | 48 | | | |
| George Swift | (England) | Full-back | 1896–1902 | 186 | 4 | 200 | 6 | | | |
| Billy Dorrell | (England) | Outside forward | 1892–1894, 1896–1899 | 102 | 36 | 116 | 47 | | | |
| Harry Trainer | (Wales) | Centre-forward | 1895–1897 | 31 | 12 | 35 | 16 | Wales | 3 | † |
| Richard Jones | (Wales) | Full-back | 1897–1901 | 104 | 1 | 113 | 1 | Wales | 1 | |
| Walter Robinson | (England) | Full-back | 1898–1905 | 177 | 3 | 194 | 3 | | | |
| Bob Pollock | (Scotland) | Wing-half | 1902–1908 | 211 | 14 | 230 | 19 | | | |
| James Blessington | (Scotland) | Inside forward | 1903–1908 | 100 | 18 | 112 | 21 | Scotland | 4 | |
| Billy Bannister | (England) | Centre-half | 1904–1910 | 149 | 15 | 160 | 18 | England | 2 | |
| Jimmy Durrant | (England) | Outside forward | 1904–1909 | 140 | 24 | 153 | 27 | | | |
| Teddy King | (England) | Wing-half | 1906–1920 | 227 | 26 | 236 | 26 | | | † |
| Horace Bailey | (England) | Goalkeeper | 1907–1910 | 68 | 0 | 70 | 0 | England | 5 | † |
| Fred Shinton | (England) | Centre-forward | 1907–1910 | 92 | 55 | 101 | 58 | | | |
| Shirley Hubbard | (England) | Centre-forward | 1907–1913, 1919–1920 | 140 | 36 | 154 | 39 | | | |
| Arthur Randle | (England) | Half-back | 1908–1912 | 123 | 2 | 133 | 2 | | | |
| Sam Currie | (Scotland) b | Full-back | 1909–1921 | 236 | 4 | 248 | 6 | | | |
| Tommy Benfield | (England) | Utility | 1910–1914 | 106 | 23 | 111 | 23 | | | |
| George Douglas | (England) | Outside forward | 1912–1920 | 127 | 10 | 133 | 11 | | | |
| Herbert Bown | (England) | Goalkeeper | 1913–1922 | 143 | 0 | 154 | 0 | | | |
| Jimmy Harrold | (England) | Centre-half | 1913–1923 | 206 | 7 | 218 | 7 | England amateurs | | |
| Billy Thomson | (Scotland) | Half-back | 1914, 1919–1923 | 197 | 3 | 209 | 3 | | | |
| Billy Barrett | (England) | Full-back | 1919–1924 | 143 | 1 | 152 | 2 | | | |
| Harry Graham | (Scotland) | Inside forward | 1920–1924 | 110 | 14 | 116 | 16 | | | |
| George Hebden | (England) | Goalkeeper | 1920–1924 | 101 | 0 | 104 | 0 | | | |
| Alex Trotter | (England) | Outside forward | 1920–1924 | 96 | 10 | 100 | 11 | | | |
| Adam Black | (Scotland) | Full-back | 1920–1935 | 528 | 4 | 557 | 4 | | | † |
| Johnny Duncan | (Scotland) | Inside forward | 1922–1930 | 279 | 88 | 295 | 95 | Scotland | 1 | † |
| John Brown | (England) | Full-back | 1922–1931 | 114 | 0 | 117 | 0 | | | |
| Norman Watson | (England) | Half-back | 1922–1932 | 173 | 1 | 178 | 1 | | | |
| Hugh Adcock | (England) | Outside forward | 1923–1935 | 434 | 51 | 460 | 52 | England | 5 | |
| Arthur Chandler | (England) | Centre-forward | 1923–1935 | 393 | 259 | 419 | 273 | | | † |
| Jack Bamber | (England) | Half-back | 1924–1927 | 113 | 7 | 120 | 7 | England | 1 | |
| Harold Wadsworth | (England) | Outside forward | 1924–1932 | 98 | 7 | 106 | 7 | | | |
| Reg Osborne | (England) | Full-back | 1924–1931 | 240 | 2 | 249 | 2 | England | 1 | |
| George Carr | (England) | Centre-half | 1924–1932 | 179 | 24 | 192 | 25 | | | |
| Arthur Lochhead | (Scotland) | Inside forward | 1925–1934 | 303 | 106 | 320 | 114 | | | |
| Ernie Hine | (England) | Inside forward | 1926–1932 | 247 | 148 | 259 | 156 | England | 6 | |
| Bill Findlay | (Scotland) | Wing-half | 1925–1932 | 100 | 0 | 104 | 0 | | | |
| Leonard Barry | (England) | Outside forward | 1927–1932 | 203 | 25 | 214 | 26 | England | 5 | |
| Jim McLaren | (Scotland) | Goalkeeper | 1927–1933 | 170 | 0 | 180 | 0 | Scotland schools | | |
| George Ritchie | (Scotland) | Wing-half | 1928–1937 | 247 | 12 | 261 | 13 | | | |
| Roger Heywood | (England) | Centre-half | 1929–1940 | 228 | 2 | 240 | 2 | | | |
| Sep Smith | (England) | Wing-half | 1929–1949 | 350 | 35 | 373 | 37 | England | 1 | † |
| Arthur Maw | (England) | Inside forward | 1932–1939 | 179 | 58 | 189 | 64 | | | |
| Danny Liddle | (Scotland) | Outside forward | 1932–1946 | 255 | 64 | 274 | 71 | Scotland | 3 | |
| Sandy McLaren | (Scotland) | Goalkeeper | 1933–1940 | 239 | 0 | 256 | 0 | Scotland | 5 | |
| Alexander Wood | (Scotland) (United States) | Full-back | 1933–1936 | 52 | 0 | 52 | 0 | United States | 4 | |
| Dai Jones | (Wales) | Full-back | 1933–1947 | 226 | 4 | 238 | 4 | Wales | 7 | |
| Billy Frame | (Scotland) | Full-back | 1933–1950 | 220 | 0 | 239 | 0 | | | |
| George Dewis | (England) | Centre-forward | 1933–1950 | 116 | 45 | 129 | 51 | | | |
| Percy Grosvenor | (England) | Half-back | 1933–1939 | 168 | 1 | 180 | 1 | | | |
| Fred Sharman | (England) | Centre-half | 1934–1944 | 190 | 18 | 200 | 18 | | | |
| Charlie Adam | (Scotland) | Outside forward | 1938–1952 | 158 | 22 | 180 | 25 | | | |
| Mal Griffiths | (Wales) | Outside forward | 1939–1956 | 373 | 66 | 409 | 76 | Wales | 11 | |
| Jack Lee | (England) | Centre-forward | 1941–1950 | 123 | 74 | 137 | 84 | England | 1 | |
| Don Revie | (England) | Centre-forward | 1944–1949 | 96 | 25 | 110 | 29 | England | 6 | |
| Johnny King | (England) | Wing-half | 1944–1954 | 197 | 5 | 218 | 5 | | | |
| Walter Harrison | (England) | Wing-half | 1945–1950 | 125 | 3 | 143 | 5 | | | |
| Johnny Anderson | (Scotland) | Goalkeeper | 1948–1960 | 261 | 0 | 277 | 0 | Scotland | 1 | |
| Derek Hines | (England) | Centre-forward | 1948–1961 | 299 | 116 | 317 | 117 | | | |
| Ron Jackson | (England) | Full-back | 1949–1955 | 161 | 0 | 173 | 1 | | | |
| Arthur Lever | (Wales) | Full-back | 1950–1954 | 119 | 0 | 124 | 0 | Wales | 1 | |
| Jimmy Baldwin | (England) | Half-back | 1950–1956 | 180 | 4 | 190 | 4 | | | |
| Arthur Rowley | (England) | Inside forward | 1950–1958 | 303 | 251 | 321 | 265 | | | † |
| Matt Gillies | (Scotland) | Centre-half | 1952–1955 | 103 | 0 | 111 | 0 | | | |
| Derek Hogg | (England) | Outside forward | 1952–1958 | 161 | 26 | 165 | 26 | | | |
| Johnny Morris | (England) | Inside forward | 1952–1958 | 206 | 33 | 220 | 34 | England | 3 | |
| Stanley Milburn | (England) | Full-back | 1952–1959 | 171 | 1 | 183 | 1 | England B | | |
| Eddie Russell | (England) | Half-back | 1953–1958 | 90 | 5 | 101 | 5 | | | |
| Jack Froggatt | (England) | Outside forward | 1954–1957 | 143 | 18 | 148 | 18 | England | 13 | |
| Willie Cunningham | (Northern Ireland) | Full-back | 1954–1960 | 127 | 4 | 138 | 4 | Northern Ireland | 30 | |
| Colin Appleton | (England) | Half-back | 1954–1966 | 277 | 19 | 333 | 22 | | | † |
| Howard Riley | (England) | Outside forward | 1955–1965 | 193 | 38 | 233 | 47 | | | |
| Tommy McDonald | (Scotland) | Outside forward | 1956–1960 | 113 | 27 | 118 | 29 | Scotland B | | |
| Jimmy Walsh | (Scotland) | Inside forward | 1956–1964 | 176 | 80 | 199 | 92 | Scotland under-23 | | |
| Len Chalmers | (England) | Full-back | 1956–1966 | 171 | 4 | 204 | 4 | | | |
| Frank McLintock | (Scotland) | Half-back | 1957–1964 | 168 | 25 | 200 | 28 | Scotland | 9 | |
| Ian King | (Scotland) | Centre-half | 1957–1966 | 244 | 6 | 297 | 7 | | | |
| Ken Leek | (Wales) | Inside forward | 1958–1961 | 93 | 34 | 111 | 43 | Wales | 13 | |
| Gordon Wills | (England) | Inside forward | 1958–1962 | 111 | 30 | 128 | 33 | | | |
| Ken Keyworth | (England) | Forward | 1958–1964 | 177 | 62 | 215 | 76 | | | |
| Richie Norman | (England) | Full-back | 1958–1968 | 303 | 2 | 365 | 5 | | | |
| John Sjoberg | (Scotland) | Full-back | 1958–1973 | 335 | 15 | 414 | 19 | | | |
| Albert Cheesebrough | (England) | Forward | 1959–1963 | 122 | 40 | 138 | 43 | England under-23 | | |
| Gordon Banks | (England) | Goalkeeper | 1959–1967 | 293 | 0 | 356 | 0 | England | 73 | † |
| Graham Cross | (England) | Utility | 1960–1976 | 498 | 29 | 600 | 37 | England under-23 | | † |
| Dave Gibson | (Scotland) | Inside forward | 1962–1970 | 280 | 41 | 339 | 53 | Scotland | 7 | |
| Mike Stringfellow | (England) | Winger | 1962–1975 | 315 | 82 | 370 | 97 | | | † |
| Jimmy Goodfellow | (Scotland) | Midfielder | 1963–1968 | 98 | 26 | 121 | 36 | | | |
| Bobby Roberts | (Scotland) | Midfielder | 1963–1970 | 229 | 26 | 281 | 36 | Scotland under-23 | | |
| Jackie Sinclair | (Scotland) | Winger | 1965–1968 | 103 | 50 | 113 | 53 | Scotland | 1 | |
| Peter Rodrigues | (Wales) | Full-back | 1965–1970 | 140 | 6 | 171 | 6 | Wales | 40 | |
| Peter Shilton | (England) | Goalkeeper | 1965–1974 | 286 | 1 | 340 | 1 | England | 125 | |
| David Nish | (England) | Full-back | 1966–1972 | 228 | 25 | 273 | 31 | England | 5 | † |
| Malcolm Manley | (Scotland) | Centre-back | 1966–1973 | 120 | 5 | 137 | 6 | Scotland schools | | |
| Rodney Fern | (England) | Forward | 1967–1972 | 152 | 32 | 188 | 40 | | | |
| Lenny Glover | (England) | Winger | 1967–1976 | 252 | 38 | 306 | 48 | | | |
| Alan Woollett | (England) | Centre-back | 1967–1978 | 228 | 0 | 260 | 0 | | | |
| Allan Clarke | (England) | Forward | 1968–1969 | 36 | 12 | 46 | 16 | England | 19 | † |
| Alistair Brown | (Scotland) | Forward | 1968–1971 | 101 | 32 | 122 | 35 | | | |
| Steve Whitworth | (England) | Full-back | 1968–1979 | 353 | 0 | 401 | 1 | England | 7 | |
| John Farrington | (England) | Winger | 1969–1973 | 118 | 18 | 146 | 27 | | | |
| Alan Birchenall | (England) | Midfielder | 1971–1977 | 163 | 12 | 183 | 14 | England under-23 | | † |
| Jon Sammels | (England) | Midfielder | 1971–1977 | 241 | 21 | 272 | 25 | England under-23 | | |
| Keith Weller | (England) | Midfielder | 1971–1979 | 262 | 37 | 297 | 43 | England | 4 | |
| Frank Worthington | (England) | Forward | 1972–1977 | 210 | 72 | 239 | 78 | England | 8 | |
| Dennis Rofe | (England) | Full-back | 1972–1980 | 290 | 6 | 324 | 6 | England under-23 | | |
| Mark Wallington | (England) | Goalkeeper | 1972–1985 | 412 | 0 | 460 | 0 | England under-23 | | |
| Steve Earle | (England) | Forward | 1974–1978 | 99 | 20 | 115 | 26 | | | |
| Steve Kember | (England) | Midfielder | 1975–1978 | 117 | 6 | 128 | 6 | | | |
| Tommy Williams | (Scotland) | Centre-back | 1975–1986 | 241 | 10 | 271 | 10 | | | |
| Kevin MacDonald | (Scotland) | Midfielder | 1976–1984, 1987 | 141 | 8 | 155 | 8 | | | |
| Eddie Kelly | (Scotland) | Midfielder | 1977–1980, 1981–1983 | 119 | 3 | 133 | 3 | Scotland under-23 | | |
| Gary Lineker | (England) | Forward | 1977–1985 | 194 | 95 | 216 | 103 | England | 80 | † |
| John O'Neill | (Northern Ireland) | Centre-back | 1978–1987 | 313 | 10 | 345 | 12 | Northern Ireland | 39 | † |
| Martin Henderson | (Scotland) | Forward | 1978–1981 | 91 | 12 | 100 | 16 | | | |
| Bobby Smith | (Scotland) | Midfielder | 1978–1986 | 181 | 21 | 200 | 22 | | | |
| Alan Young | (Scotland) | Forward | 1979–1982 | 104 | 26 | 119 | 29 | | | |
| Andy Peake | (England) | Midfielder | 1979–1985 | 147 | 13 | 162 | 13 | England under-21 | | |
| Ian Wilson | (Scotland) | Midfielder | 1979–1987 | 285 | 17 | 318 | 19 | Scotland | 5 | |
| Paul Ramsey | (Northern Ireland) | Midfielder | 1980–1991 | 290 | 13 | 322 | 15 | Northern Ireland | 14 | |
| Steve Lynex | (England) | Winger | 1981–1987 | 213 | 57 | 240 | 60 | | | |
| Alan Smith | (England) | Forward | 1982–1987 | 200 | 76 | 217 | 84 | England | 13 | |
| Ian Andrews | (England) | Goalkeeper | 1982–1988, 1997–1998; 2002 | 126 | 0 | 139 | 0 | England under-21 | | |
| Ian Banks | (England) | Midfielder | 1983–1987 | 93 | 14 | 103 | 15 | | | |
| Simon Morgan | (England) | Full-back | 1984–1990 | 160 | 3 | 182 | 4 | England under-21 | | |
| Russell Osman | (England) | Centre-back | 1985–1988 | 108 | 8 | 120 | 8 | England | 11 | |
| Gary McAllister | (Scotland) | Midfielder | 1985–1990 | 201 | 46 | 225 | 51 | Scotland | 57 | |
| Ally Mauchlen | (Scotland) | Midfielder | 1985–1992 | 239 | 11 | 273 | 12 | | | |
| Paul Reid | (England) | Midfielder | 1986–1992 | 162 | 21 | 189 | 25 | | | |
| Steve Walsh | (England) | Centre-back | 1986–2000 | 369 | 53 | 450 | 62 | | | † |
| Alan Paris | (England) | Full-back | 1988–1991 | 88 | 3 | 102 | 5 | | | † |
| Richard Smith | (England) | Centre-back | 1988–1996 | 98 | 1 | 120 | 2 | | | |
| Tommy Wright | (Scotland) | Winger | 1989–1992 | 129 | 22 | 151 | 29 | | | |
| Tony James | (England) | Centre-back | 1989–1994 | 107 | 10 | 119 | 11 | | | † |
| Gary Mills | (England) | Midfielder | 1989–1994 | 200 | 16 | 232 | 17 | England under-21 | | † |
| David Oldfield | (England) | Midfielder | 1990–1995 | 188 | 26 | 221 | 32 | England under-21 | | |
| Steve Thompson | (England) | Midfielder | 1991–1995 | 127 | 18 | 155 | 25 | | | |
| Kevin Poole | (England) | Goalkeeper | 1991–1997 | 163 | 0 | 193 | 0 | | | † |
| David Lowe | (England) | Winger | 1992–1994 | 94 | 22 | 108 | 23 | England under-21 | | |
| Julian Joachim | (England) | Forward | 1992–1996 | 99 | 25 | 119 | 31 | England under-21 | | |
| Simon Grayson | (England) | Full-back | 1992–1997 | 188 | 4 | 229 | 6 | | | † |
| Colin Hill | (Northern Ireland) | Centre-back | 1992–1997 | 145 | 0 | 175 | 1 | Northern Ireland | 27 | † |
| Mike Whitlow | (England) | Full-back | 1992–1997 | 147 | 8 | 179 | 9 | | | |
| Iwan Roberts | (Wales) | Forward | 1993–1996 | 100 | 41 | 111 | 44 | Wales | 15 | |
| Emile Heskey | (England) | Forward | 1994–2000 | 154 | 40 | 197 | 46 | England | 62 | |
| Garry Parker | (England) | Midfielder | 1995–2001 | 114 | 10 | 147 | 16 | England B | | † |
| Steve Claridge | (England) | Forward | 1996–1998 | 63 | 17 | 79 | 21 | | | † |
| Kasey Keller | (United States) | Goalkeeper | 1996–1999 | 99 | 0 | 125 | 0 | United States | 102 | |
| Neil Lennon | (Northern Ireland) | Midfielder | 1996–2000 | 170 | 6 | 208 | 9 | Northern Ireland | 40 | |
| Muzzy Izzet | (Turkey) | Midfielder | 1996–2004 | 269 | 38 | 319 | 47 | Turkey | 9 | |
| Steve Guppy | (England) | Winger | 1997–2001, 2004 | 161 | 9 | 189 | 10 | England | 1 | |
| Tony Cottee | (England) | Forward | 1997–2000 | 85 | 27 | 100 | 34 | England | 7 | † |
| Robbie Savage | (Wales) | Midfielder | 1997–2002 | 172 | 8 | 204 | 9 | Wales | 39 | † |
| Matt Elliott | (Scotland) | Centre-back | 1997–2005 | 245 | 27 | 290 | 33 | Scotland | 18 | † |
| Frank Sinclair | (Jamaica) | Full-back | 1998–2004 | 164 | 3 | 194 | 4 | Jamaica | 28 | |
| Andy Impey | (England) | Full-back | 1998–2004 | 152 | 2 | 178 | 2 | England under-21 | | |
| Gerry Taggart | (Northern Ireland) | Centre-back | 1998–2004 | 117 | 9 | 142 | 12 | Northern Ireland | 51 | † |
| Jordan Stewart | (England) | Full-back | 1999–2005 | 110 | 6 | 127 | 6 | England under-21 | | |
| Callum Davidson | (Scotland) | Full-back | 2000–2004 | 101 | 2 | 114 | 2 | Scotland | 19 | |
| James Scowcroft | (England) | Forward | 2001–2005 | 133 | 24 | 147 | 28 | England under-21 | | |
| Ian Walker | (England) | Goalkeeper | 2001–2005 | 140 | 0 | 156 | 0 | England | 4 | |
| Paul Dickov | (Scotland) | Forward | 2002–2004, 2008–2010 | 110 | 34 | 125 | 40 | Scotland | 10 | † |
| Les Ferdinand | (England) | Forward | 2003–2004 | 29 | 12 | 31 | 13 | England | 17 | † |
| Joey Guðjónsson | (Iceland) | Midfielder | 2004–2006 | 77 | 10 | 89 | 13 | Iceland | 34 | † |
| Danny Tiatto | (Australia) | Full-back | 2004–2007 | 73 | 3 | 83 | 3 | Australia | 23 | † |
| Richard Stearman | (England) | Centre-back | 2004–2008 | 116 | 7 | 130 | 11 | England under-21 | | † |
| Stephen Hughes | (Scotland) | Midfielder | 2005–2007 | 91 | 7 | 100 | 8 | Scotland | 1 | |
| Iain Hume | (Canada) | Forward | 2005–2008 | 122 | 33 | 132 | 34 | Canada | 43 | † |
| Alan Maybury | (Republic of Ireland) | Full-back | 2005–2008 | 85 | 3 | 102 | 3 | Republic of Ireland | 10 | |
| Patrick Kisnorbo | (Australia) | Centre-back | 2005–2009 | 126 | 10 | 140 | 12 | Australia | 18 | |
| Matty Fryatt | (England) | Forward | 2006–2011 | 168 | 51 | 189 | 62 | England under-19 | | |
| Andy King | (Wales) | Midfielder | 2006–2019 | 329 | 55 | 379 | 62 | Wales | 50 | † |
| Jack Hobbs | (England) | Centre-back | 2008–2011 | 115 | 1 | 129 | 1 | England under-19 | | † |
| Steve Howard | (Scotland) | Forward | 2008–2012 | 147 | 28 | 169 | 32 | Scotland B | | † |
| Matt Oakley | (England) | Midfielder | 2008–2012 | 137 | 10 | 148 | 10 | England under-21 | | |
| Lloyd Dyer | (England) | Midfielder | 2008–2014 | 230 | 30 | 265 | 39 | | | |
| Richie Wellens | (England) | Midfielder | 2009–2013 | 129 | 4 | 147 | 6 | | | † |
| Paul Gallagher | (Scotland) | Midfielder | 2009–2013 | 118 | 25 | 137 | 28 | Scotland | 1 | |
| Martyn Waghorn | (England) | Forward | 2009–2014 | 103 | 20 | 116 | 20 | England under-21 | | |
| Jeffrey Schlupp | (Ghana) | Full-back | 2010–2017 | 126 | 10 | 150 | 15 | Ghana | 20 | |
| Paul Konchesky | (England) | Full-back | 2011–2015 | 138 | 5 | 155 | 5 | England | 2 | |
| David Nugent | (England) | Forward | 2011–2015 | 159 | 54 | 180 | 59 | England | 1 | |
| Kasper Schmeichel | (Denmark) | Goalkeeper | 2011–2022 | 414 | 0 | 479 | 0 | Denmark | 120 | † |
| Wes Morgan | (Jamaica) | Centre-back | 2011–2021 | 277 | 11 | 323 | 14 | Jamaica | 30 | † |
| Anthony Knockaert | (France) | Winger | 2012–2015 | 93 | 13 | 106 | 16 | France under-21 | | |
| Ritchie De Laet | (Belgium) | Full-back | 2012–2016 | 115 | 4 | 129 | 5 | Belgium | 2 | |
| Danny Drinkwater | (England) | Midfielder | 2012–2017 | 193 | 13 | 218 | 14 | England | 3 | † |
| Matty James | (England) | Midfielder | 2012–2021 | 101 | 4 | 117 | 5 | England under-20 | | |
| Jamie Vardy | (England) | Forward | 2012–2025 | 440 | 183 | 500 | 200 | England | 26 | † |
| Esteban Cambiasso | (Argentina) | Midfielder | 2014–2015 | 31 | 5 | 33 | 5 | Argentina | 52 | † |
| Marc Albrighton | (England) | Winger | 2014–2024 | 236 | 13 | 313 | 19 | England under-21 | | |
| Riyad Mahrez | (Algeria) | Winger | 2014–2018 | 158 | 42 | 179 | 48 | Algeria | 107 | † |
| Leonardo Ulloa | (Argentina) | Forward | 2014–2018 | 86 | 18 | 102 | 20 | | | |
| Danny Simpson | (England) | Full-back | 2014–2019 | 113 | 0 | 133 | 0 | | | |
| Shinji Okazaki | (Japan) | Forward | 2015–2019 | 114 | 14 | 137 | 19 | Japan | 119 | |
| Ben Chilwell | (England) | Full-back | 2015–2020 | 99 | 4 | 123 | 4 | England | 21 | |
| Christian Fuchs | (Austria) | Full-back | 2015–2021 | 116 | 2 | 152 | 3 | Austria | 78 | |
| Daniel Amartey | (Ghana) | Utility | 2015–2023 | 106 | 2 | 145 | 3 | Ghana | 53 | |
| Demarai Gray | (Jamaica) | Winger | 2016–2021 | 133 | 10 | 169 | 13 | Jamaica | 29 | |
| Harvey Barnes | (England) | Winger | 2016–2023 | 146 | 35 | 187 | 45 | England | 1 | |
| Papy Mendy | (Senegal) | Midfielder | 2016–2023 | 98 | 1 | 118 | 1 | Senegal | 36 | |
| Harry Maguire | (England) | Centre-back | 2017–2019 | 69 | 5 | 76 | 5 | England | 64 | † |
| Hamza Choudhury | (Bangladesh) | Utility | 2017–2026 | 123 | 1 | 166 | 3 | Bangladesh | 10 | |
| Wilfred Ndidi | (Nigeria) | Midfielder | 2017–2025 | 252 | 11 | 303 | 18 | Nigeria | 71 | |
| Kelechi Iheanacho | (Nigeria) | Forward | 2017–2024 | 173 | 35 | 232 | 61 | Nigeria | 59 | † |
| Jonny Evans | (Northern Ireland) | Centre-back | 2018–2023 | 121 | 5 | 152 | 7 | Northern Ireland | 107 | |
| James Maddison | (England) | Midfielder | 2018–2023 | 163 | 43 | 203 | 55 | England | 7 | † |
| Ricardo Pereira | (Portugal) | Full-back | 2018–2026 | 189 | 12 | 220 | 15 | Portugal | 7 | † |
| Çağlar Söyüncü | (Turkey) | Centre-back | 2018–2023 | 98 | 4 | 132 | 4 | Turkey | 59 | |
| Youri Tielemans | (Belgium) | Midfielder | 2019–2023 | 151 | 21 | 195 | 28 | Belgium | 81 | † |
| Ayoze Pérez | (Spain) | Midfielder | 2019–2023 | 80 | 12 | 114 | 15 | Spain | 5 | |
| Kiernan Dewsbury-Hall | (England) | Midfielder | 2019–2024 | 103 | 15 | 129 | 17 | | | † |
| James Justin | (England) | Full-back | 2019–2025 | 140 | 6 | 169 | 11 | England | 1 | |
| Dennis Praet | (Belgium) | Midfielder | 2019–2024 | 81 | 3 | 107 | 5 | Belgium | 15 | |
| Timothy Castagne | (Belgium) | Full-back | 2020–2023 | 91 | 5 | 112 | 5 | Belgium | 60 | |
| **Luke Thomas** | (England) | Full-back | 2020– | 123 | 3 | 163 | 4 | England under-21 | | |
| Patson Daka | (Zambia) | Forward | 2021–2026 | 137 | 22 | 165 | 29 | Zambia | 54 | |
| Boubakary Soumaré | (France) | Midfielder | 2021–2026 | 92 | 0 | 111 | 0 | France under-21 | | |
| Jannik Vestergaard | (Denmark) | Centre-back | 2021–2026 | 101 | 5 | 118 | 5 | Denmark | 59 | |
| Wout Faes | (Belgium) | Centre-back | 2022–2026 | 124 | 5 | 136 | 6 | Belgium | 28 | |
| **Stephy Mavididi** | (England) | Winger | 2023– | 117 | 19 | 127 | 23 | England under-20 | | |
| Harry Winks | (England) | Midfielder | 2023–2026 | 101 | 3 | 109 | 5 | England | 10 | |
| Abdul Fatawu | (Ghana) | Winger | 2023–2026 | 95 | 15 | 100 | 16 | Ghana | 27 | |
| Jordan James | (Wales) | Midfielder | 2025–2026 | 34 | 11 | 34 | 11 | Wales | 26 | † |

== Notes ==
^{A} Includes Football League Play-Offs, UEFA Cup Winners' Cup, UEFA Cup, Charity and Community Shield, Football League Trophy and Full Members Cup matches.
