= 1928–29 Leicester City F.C. season =

1928–29 season of Leicester City

Leicester City
1928–29 season
- Manager: Willie Orr
- First Division: 2nd
- FA Cup: 5th Round
- Top goalscorer: League: Arthur Chandler (34); All: Arthur Chandler (34)
Home colours

The 1928–29 season was Leicester City's 31st season in the Football League and their 5th in the First Division. Led by their formidable strike force of Ernie Hine, Arthur Chandler and Arthur Lochhead (all three of whom are still placed today among Leicester's top five goalscorers of all-time) and inspirational captain and creative lynch-pin Johnny Duncan, Leicester finished runners-up in the First Division, just one point behind winners The Wednesday. It was the club's highest ever league finish until the 2015–16 Season where the team won their first ever top division championship.

The most remarkable game of the season came on 20 October 1928 in which Leicester thrashed Portsmouth 10–0, which still stands as Leicester's record league victory. The club's all-time record goalscorer Arthur Chandler netted an incredible six goals in the game. A legend surrounding the game says that just after Chandler scored his 5th goal of the afternoon, 5 swans flew over Filbert Street. Several minutes later a further sixth swan flew overhead, to which Chandler promptly responded by scoring his sixth goal of the afternoon.

== Overview ==
The close season saw Leicester hold on to the spine of the team that had helped them to third place in the First Division the previous season. A bid for star man and club captain Johnny Duncan from Everton firmly rejected, while a deal for George Ritchie, who signed from Falkirk remained the major transfer dealing of the summer.

An indifferent start to the season saw Leicester sit 14th after 8 games and the season got worse after both Duncan and Reg Osborne picked up injuries which would see them kept out for lengthy periods of the season soon after.

However, fortunes began to turn on the pitch as Leicester picked up four wins on the bounce, including the legendary 10–0 win against Portsmouth. Leicester, who were being captained for the first time by centre half George Carr, were 5–0 up at half-time, in a first-half which included a 14-minute Arthur Chandler hat-trick. After 70 minutes when Chandler netted his 5th goal, five swans flew over Filbert Street, which led to cheers from the home crowd. A few minutes later, after Ernie Hine had made it 8–0, a sixth swan flew overhead, which caused the crowd to react and call for Chandler to score his sixth, to which Chandler responded by promptly scoring, to equal teammate's Johnny Duncan's record of scoring 6 goals in a single match. Hine rounded up a hat-trick of his own shortly afterwards to make it 10-0 and to round off Leicester's record ever league win.

Inspired by this win Leicester rapidly began to climb the table and by 6 April, Leicester sat in second place 4 points off the lead with a game in hand However, it was ironically defeat against Portsmouth in their game in hand which may have cost Leicester the title as Leicester took 6 points from their final 5 games, they ended up the season as division runners-up, knowing that just one more point would have been enough to clinch the title from The Wednesday, having finished the season with a superior goal average.

== Results ==
=== Football League First Division ===
Pos	Team	Pld	W	D	L	GF	GA	GAv	Pts
1	The Wednesday (C)	42	21	10	11	86	62	1.387	52
2	Leicester City	42	21	9	12	96	67	1.433	51
3	Aston Villa	42	23	4	15	98	81	1.210	50
4	Sunderland	42	20	7	15	93	75	1.240	47
5	Liverpool	42	17	12	13	90	64	1.406	46

Source: World Football
Rules for classification: 1) Points; 2) Goal average; 3) Goals scored
(C) Champions
- Leicester City scores given first

Match	Date	Opponents	Venue	Result	Scorers	Attendance
1	25 August 1928	Manchester United	A	1–1	Hine	20,129
2	27 August 1928	Birmingham City	H	5–3	Hine, Chandler (2), Lochhead (2)	22,589
3	1 September 1928	Leeds United	H	4–4	Barry, Hine, Chandler (2)	27,507
4	8 September 1928	Liverpool	A	3–6	Baxter, Chandler, Gibson	26,900
5	10 September 1928	Birmingham City	A	0–1		11,449
6	15 September 1928	West Ham United	H	5–0	Barry, Chandler (2), Lochhead, Hine	24,654
7	22 September 1928	Newcastle	A	0–1		30,816
8	29 September 1928	Burnley	H	1–1	Chandler	26,506
9	6 October 1928	Cardiff City	A	2–1	Carr, Hine	19,477
10	13 October 1928	Sheffield United	H	3–1	Chandler (2), Hine	25,438
11	20 October 1928	Portsmouth	H	10–0	Hine (3), Barry, Chandler (6)	23,621
12	27 October 1928	Manchester City	A	3–2	Lochhead, Adcock, Hine	33,982
13	3 November 1928	The Wednesday	H	1–1	Hine	29,522
14	10 November 1928	Derby County	A	2–5	Hine, Lochhead	24,673
15	17 November 1928	Sunderland	H	1–0	Chandler	24,178
16	24 November 1928	Blackburn Rovers	A	1–1	Hine	10,831
17	1 December 1928	Arsenal	H	1–1	Chandler	26,851
18	8 December 1928	Everton	A	1–3	Chandler	10,831
19	15 December 1928	Huddersfield Town	H	4–1	Hine (2), Chandler (2)	19,528
20	22 December 1928	Bolton Wanderers	A	0–5		16,030
21	25 December 1928	Bury	A	1–3	Chandler	19,805
22	26 December 1928	Bury	H	5–2	Hine (3), Adcock, Lochhead	32,807
23	29 December 1928	Manchester United	H	2–1	Hine (2)	21,532
24	5 January 1929	Leeds United	A	3–4	Chandler, Lochhead, Hine (2)	18,870
25	19 January 1929	Liverpool	H	2–0	Hine (2)(1p)	21,764
26	2 February 1929	Newcastle United	H	1–1	Adcock	20,796
27	9 February 1929	Burnley	A	1–0	Chandler	14,879
28	21 February 1929	Cardiff City	H	2–0	Lovatt, Hine (p)	12,938
29	23 February 1929	Sheffield United	A	4–1	Lochhead, Chandler (2), Hine	19,045
30	4 March 1929	West Ham United	A	1–2	Lovatt	8,603
31	9 March 1929	Manchester City	H	3–2	Hine (2), Lochhead	21,396
32	16 March 1929	The Wednesday	A	0–1		30,176
33	23 March 1929	Derby County	H	1–0	Hine	23,622
34	30 March 1929	Sunderland	A	2–1	Lochhead, Chandler	22,849
35	1 April 1929	Aston Villa	H	4–1	Adcock (p), Lochhead, Duncan, Chandler	35,744
36	2 April 1929	Aston Villa	A	2–4	Chandler (2)	31,909
37	6 April 1929	Blackburn Rovers	H	2–1	Chandler (2)	19,328
38	10 April 1929	Portsmouth	A	0–1		21,102
39	13 April 1929	Arsenal	A	1–1	Chandler	19,139
40	20 April 1929	Everton	H	4–1	Chandler, Hine (2), Lochhead	19,006
41	27 April 1929	Huddersfield Town	A	1–1	Duncan	8,778
42	4 May 1929	Bolton Wanderers	H	6–1	Lochhead, Lovatt (3), Hine (2)	19,912

=== FA Cup ===
- Leicester City scores given first

Round	Date	Opponents	Venue	Result	Scorers	Attendance
3	12 January 1929	Lincoln City	A	1–0	Lochhead	16,849
4	26 January 1929	Swansea Town	H	1–0	Lochhead	39,188
5	16 February 1929	Bolton Wanderers	H	1–2	Lochhead	30,591

== Club statistics ==
All data from: Dave Smith and Paul Taylor, Of Fossils and Foxes: The Official Definitive History of Leicester City Football Club (2001) (ISBN 1-899538-21-6)

=== Appearances ===
Pos.	Nat.	Name	Div 1	FAC	Total
GK	(Scotland)	Jim McLaren	34	3	37
GK	(Scotland)	Ken Campbell	8	0	8
DF	(Scotland)	Adam Black	40	3	43
DF	(England)	John Brown	31	1	32
DF	(South Africa) (England)	Reg Osborne	12	2	14
MF	(Scotland)	Bill Findlay	19	0	19
MF	(England)	George Carr	39	3	42
MF	(Scotland)	Johnny Duncan	27	1	28
MF	(England)	Hugh Adcock	40	3	43
MF	(Scotland)	Jimmy Baxter	2	0	2
MF	(England)	Norman Watson	16	2	18
MF	(Scotland)	George Ritchie	28	3	31
MF	(Scotland)	Pat Carrigan	5	0	5
FW	(England)	Ernie Hine	35	3	38
FW	(England)	Arthur Chandler	40	3	43
FW	(Scotland)	Arthur Lochhead	36	3	39
FW	(England)	Len Barry	40	3	43
FW	(Scotland)	Tom Gibson	2	0	2
FW	(England)	William Bell	2	0	2
FW	(England)	Walter Langford	2	0	2
FW	(England)	Harry Lovatt	4	0	4

==== Starting XI ====
The following players have been named in the most starting line-ups. This line-up may differ from the list of players with most appearances.

No.	Nat.	Pos.	Name	Starts
1	(Scotland)	GK	Jim McLaren	37
2	(Scotland)	RB	Adam Black	43
3	(England)	LB	John Brown	32
4	(Scotland)	RH	Johnny Duncan	28
5	(England)	CH	George Carr	42
6	(Scotland)	LH	George Ritchie	31
7	(England)	OR	Hugh Adcock	43
8	(England)	IR	Ernie Hine	38
9	(England)	CF	Arthur Chandler	43
10	(Scotland)	IL	Arthur Lochhead	39
11	(England)	OL	Len Barry	43

2–3–5 Formation

=== Top goalscorers ===
Pos.	Nat.	Name	Div 1	FAC	Total
1	(England)	Arthur Chandler	34	0	34
2	(England)	Ernie Hine	32	0	32
3	(Scotland)	Arthur Lochhead	13	3	16
4	(England)	Harry Lovatt	5	0	5
5	(England)	Hugh Adcock	5	0	5
6	(England)	Len Barry	3	0	3
7	(Scotland)	Johnny Duncan	2	0	2
8	(England)	George Carr	1	0	1
=	(Scotland)	James Baxter	1	0	1
=	(Scotland)	Tom Gibson	1	0	1
