= Harry Lovatt =

English footballer (c. 1904-1984)

Personal information
- Full name: Harry Lovatt (given name Harry not Harold)
- Date of birth: c. 1904
- Date of death: 11 November 1984
- Height: 5 ft 9 in (1.75 m)
- Position: Forward

Youth career
- Wood Lane United
- Red Street St Chad's
- Audley

Senior career*
Years	Team	Apps	(Gls)
1923–1924	Port Vale	0	(0)
1924–1925	Preston North End	0	(0)
1925–1926	Crewe Alexandra	27	(14)
1926	Bradford City	13	(3)
1926–1927	Wrexham	11	(5)
1927–1928	Scarborough		
1928–1930	Leicester City	10	(9)
1930–1931	Notts County	9	(3)
1931–1932	Northampton Town	14	(7)
1932	Macclesfield Town	4	(4)
- Stafford Rangers
- Winsford United
- * Club domestic league appearances and goals

Harry Lovatt (c.1904 – 1984) was an English footballer. A much-travelled forward, he played for Port Vale, Preston North End, Crewe Alexandra, Bradford City, Wrexham, Scarborough, Leicester City, Notts County, Northampton Town, Macclesfield Town, Stafford Rangers, and Winsford United.

== Career ==
Lovatt played for local non-League clubs Wood Lane United, Red Street St Chad's and Audley in his youth. In 1923 he joined Port Vale, the next year moving on to Preston North End, but failed to make a league appearance for either club.

In 1925, he joined Crewe Alexandra, scoring 14 goals in 27 Third Division North games. He spent part of 1926 with Bradford City, scoring three goals in 13 Second Division games before joining Welsh club Wrexham, scoring five goals in 11 Third Division North games, including a hat-trick against Chesterfield on 15 January 1927. He spent the 1927–28 season with Midland League side Scarborough, and became the club's top-scorer with 40 league and cup goals. This record won him a contract with Leicester City, and he scored five goals in four First Division games in the 1928–29 season, including a hat-trick in a 6–1 win over Bolton Wanderers at Filbert Street on 4 May. He scored four goals in five league games in 1929–30, but played just one game in 1930–31 before moving to Notts County in December 1930.

Three goals in nine games at County followed as he helped the "Magpies" to win the Third Division South title. He moved on again in 1931, joining Northampton Town. He struck seven times in 14 Third Division South games before he left the Football League to join up with Macclesfield Town, Stafford Rangers and then Winsford United.

== Career statistics ==
Appearances and goals by club, season and competition
Club	Season	League			FA Cup		Total	
Club	Season	Division	Apps	Goals	Apps	Goals	Apps	Goals
Port Vale	1923–24	Second Division	0	0	0	0	0	0
Preston North End	1924–25	First Division	0	0	0	0	0	0
Crewe Alexandra	1925–26	Third Division North	27	14	4	1	31	15
Bradford City	1923–24	Second Division	9	3	0	0	9	3
Bradford City	1924–25	Second Division	4	0	0	0	4	0
Bradford City	Total		13	3	0	0	13	3
Wrexham	1926–27	Third Division North	11	5	1	0	12	5
Leicester City	1928–29	First Division	4	5	0	0	4	5
Leicester City	1929–30	First Division	5	4	0	0	5	4
Leicester City	1930–31	First Division	1	0	0	0	1	0
Leicester City	Total		10	9	0	0	10	9
Notts County	1930–31	Third Division South	7	1	2	0	9	1
Notts County	1931–32	Second Division	2	2	0	0	2	2
Notts County	Total		9	3	2	0	11	3
Northampton Town	1931–32	Third Division South	14	7	4	4	18	11
Macclesfield Town	1932–33	Cheshire County League	4	4	2	0	6	4

== Honours ==
Notts County

- Football League Third Division South: 1930–31
