= 2016–17 Premier League =

Football season in England

Premier League
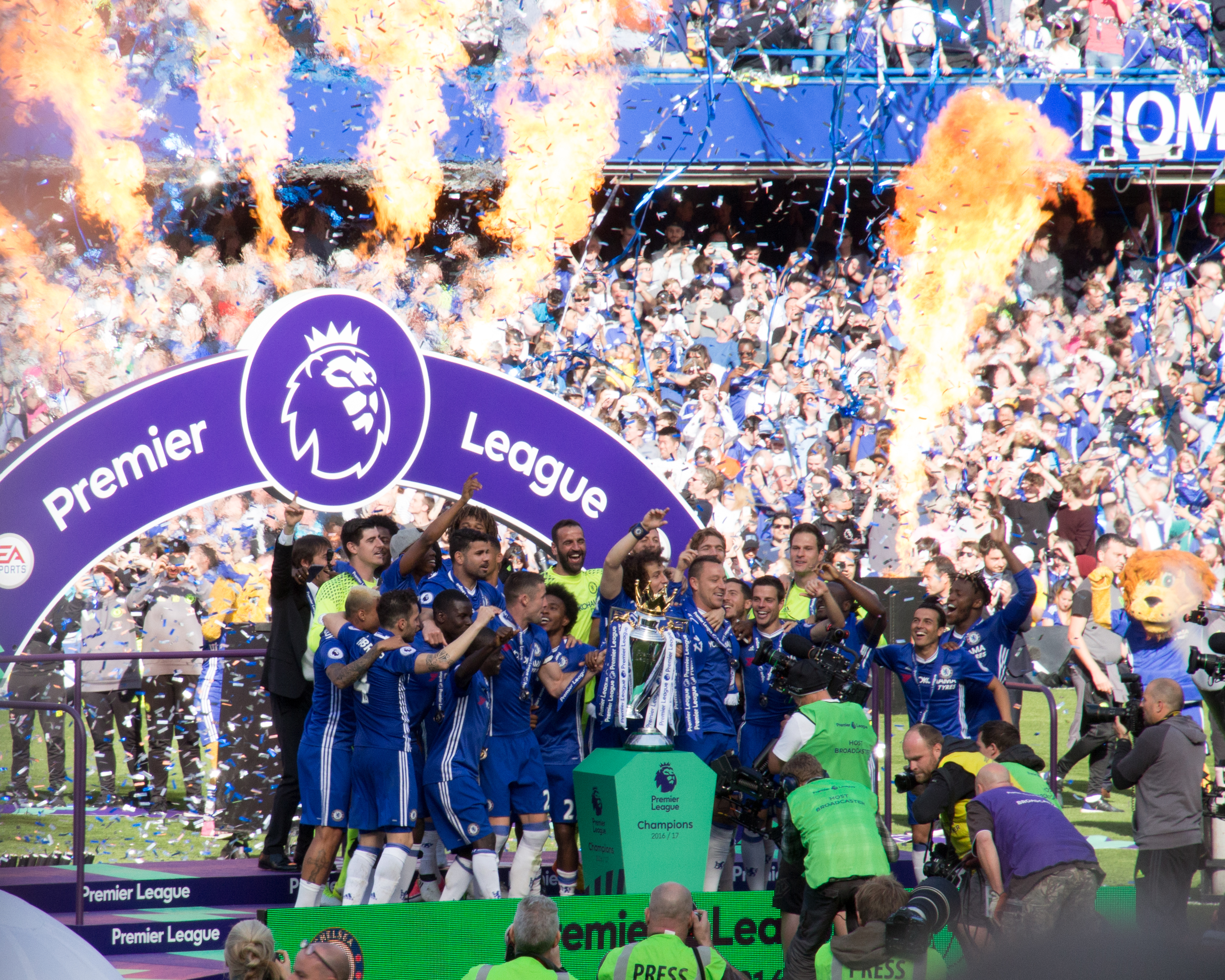
- Season: 2016–17
- Dates: 13 August 2016 – 21 May 2017
- Champions: Chelsea; 5th Premier League title 6th English title
- Relegated: Hull City; Middlesbrough; Sunderland
- Champions League: Chelsea; Tottenham Hotspur; Manchester City; Liverpool; Manchester United (as Europa League winners)
- Europa League: Arsenal; Everton
- Matches: 380
- Goals: 1,064 (2.8 per match)
- Top goalscorer: Harry Kane (29 goals)
- Best goalkeeper: Thibaut Courtois (16 clean sheets)
- Biggest home win: Bournemouth 6–1 Hull City (15 October 2016); Chelsea 5–0 Everton (5 November 2016); Liverpool 6–1 Watford (6 November 2016); Tottenham Hotspur 5–0 Swansea City (3 December 2016); Manchester City 5–0 Crystal Palace (6 May 2017)
- Biggest away win: Hull City 1–7 Tottenham Hotspur (21 May 2017)
- Highest scoring: Swansea City 5–4 Crystal Palace (26 November 2016); Everton 6–3 Bournemouth (4 February 2017)
- Longest winning run: 13 matches Chelsea
- Longest unbeaten run: 25 matches Manchester United
- Longest winless run: 16 matches Middlesbrough
- Longest losing run: 6 matches ( Crystal Palace; Hull City; Watford)
- Highest attendance: 75,397; Manchester United 0–0 West Bromwich Albion (1 April 2017)
- Lowest attendance: 10,890; Bournemouth 4–0 Middlesbrough (22 April 2017)
- Total attendance: 13,612,316
- Average attendance: 35,821

The 2016–17 Premier League was the 25th season of the Premier League, the top English professional league for association football clubs, since its establishment in 1992, and the 118th season of top-flight English football overall. The season began on 13 August 2016 and concluded on 21 May 2017. Fixtures for the 2016–17 season were announced on 15 June 2016.

Chelsea won their fifth Premier League title, and sixth English title, with two matches to spare following a 1–0 away win over West Bromwich Albion on 12 May. For the fourth time in seven years, the top-seven places were dominated by the so-called ‘Big Six’ clubs (Arsenal, Chelsea, Liverpool, Manchester City, Manchester United and Tottenham Hotspur) and Everton. The ‘Big Six’ also dominated the top-six places for the second time in three seasons. This is also the most recent season where Everton both finished in the top seven and qualified for Europe.

The defending champions were Leicester City, who finished 12th, thereby setting a new record for the worst Premier League title defence; the record had previously been held by Chelsea, who had finished 10th in 2015–16 after winning the title in 2014–15. When including the Football League era, it was the worst title defence since 1991–92 champions Leeds United finished 17th in 1992–93.

Burnley, Middlesbrough, and Hull City entered as the three promoted teams from the 2015–16 Football League Championship. Only Burnley avoided immediate relegation back to the Championship. Until 2026, this was the most recent season in which Manchester City or Liverpool didn't win the league, until the 2025–26, when Arsenal won it, for the first time since 2003–04.

An independent commission later found that Manchester City breached Premier League financial rules during this season, part of a pattern of breaches spanning from 2009 to 2018.

== Overview ==
=== Premier League rebranding ===
On 9 February 2016, the Premier League announced a rebrand; beginning with the 2016–17 season, the competition was known simply as the Premier League, without any sponsor's name attached. As part of the rebranding, a new logo was introduced.

=== Ticket prices ===
From the beginning of the 2016–17 season, ticket prices for away fans were capped at £30 per ticket.

=== Summary ===
Three of the "Big Six" clubs appointed big name managers in advance of the season: Antonio Conte at Chelsea, José Mourinho at Manchester United and Pep Guardiola at Manchester City, while Jürgen Klopp was in his first full season at Liverpool.

Conte enjoyed the most successful start, winning the title and earning a record number of league victories for a season, with only poor early form preventing Chelsea from also setting a new points total. Tottenham Hotspur shrugged off a disappointing Champions League campaign to push Chelsea close for the title, though they ultimately missed out. However, they finished the season with statistically both the best attack and defence, with striker Harry Kane once again claiming the Golden Boot. Furthermore, the season marked the end of Tottenham's 118-year stay at the White Hart Lane stadium, temporarily using Wembley for the subsequent season, before a new stadium move. Manchester City finished one spot better than the previous season, though they ended the season trophy-less, despite recording the third-best attack and reaching the semi-finals of the FA Cup. Liverpool made the Champions League for the first time in three years, though they were prevented from finishing any higher than fourth by an inconsistent start to 2017, a consequence of both losing their £35 million signing Sadio Mané to international duty in January and February and suffering from several dropped points against bottom-half teams.

Despite winning seven of their final eight games, Arsenal finished fifth and failed to qualify for the Champions League for the first time since 1997, as fan pressure on both manager Arsène Wenger and majority-shareholder Stan Kroenke grew. While they did win the FA Cup for the third time in four seasons, making Wenger the most successful manager in the competition's history, they endured yet another disappointing Champions League run, eliminated at the round of 16 for a seventh successive year. Manchester United finished sixth, one lower than the previous season, with their failure to turn any one of their 15 draws – with 12 earned amidst the season-record 25 matches unbeaten run – into victories proving problematic. They did at least win the EFL Cup and won the Europa League final. The latter was the first Europa League title in their history, not only securing a place in the Champions League but also made them only the fifth club to have won all three major European trophies. Everton, the final team to qualify for the UEFA competitions, made their first return to that level for 3 years. Under Ronald Koeman, who replaced Roberto Martínez following his sacking towards the end of the previous season after a period of mid-table stagnation, the club would spend virtually the entire season in the Europa League places; never mounting any serious push for the Champions League places, but always remaining well clear of the rest of the league. This also meant that for the fourth time in seven seasons, the top seven positions were occupied by the same teams.

In only their second-ever top-flight season, Bournemouth built on the success of the previous season as they secured a ninth-place finish and scored 55 goals, defying the critics who had tipped them to struggle from second-season syndrome. Much as Chelsea had the previous season, Leicester City made a poor defence of their title, despite having what turned out to be the best Champions League run of any English club this season. They were beaten by Hull City in the first match, the first time this has happened to a reigning Premier League champion. With the club struggling, manager Claudio Ranieri was sacked in February and replaced by coach Craig Shakespeare, who steered the club to 12th. It broke the record of the lowest finish for Premier League title holders, set by Chelsea the previous season by finishing 10th, but comfortably clear of relegation.

Swansea City had looked dead and buried after early struggles under Francesco Guidolin and then a disastrous spell with Bob Bradley as manager, but were saved by a late improvement under Paul Clement's management. Burnley fared the best of the promoted clubs, with only atrocious away form preventing them finishing higher as they made their home-ground of Turf Moor one of the hardest places to get a point from – and secured a second successive top-flight season for the first time in 40 years. Watford, in their first successive top-flight campaign for 30 years, successfully ensured a third consecutive Premier League season – however, as a result of poor away form, a disastrous end to the season and several spells of indifferent form throughout the campaign, the Hornets were unable to really build on the previous season despite recording their first league victories over Manchester United and at Arsenal since the 1980s.

After several successive escapes from relegation, Sunderland's resilience finally broke and they dropped into the Championship after a decade, having spent virtually the entire season rooted to the bottom of the table. Middlesbrough also struggled through their first top-flight season in eight years, with a poor end to the season, the weakest goal-scoring record in the division and an inability to turn one of their 13 draws into victories dooming them. Hull City were the final relegated side, never quite recovering from a disastrous pre-season which saw manager Steve Bruce quit and next to no new players signed. Despite encouraging early season form under Mike Phelan, a dismal run in the winter saw him sacked and replaced by Marco Silva, who steered the club to a much better second half of the season, but it ultimately proved to be a case of too little, too late.

== Teams ==
Twenty teams competed in the league – the top seventeen teams from the previous season and the three teams promoted from the Championship. The promoted teams were Burnley, Middlesbrough and Hull City. Burnley and Hull City returned to the top flight after a season's absence while Middlesbrough returned after a seven-year absence. They replaced Newcastle United, Norwich City and Aston Villa, who were relegated to the Championship after their top flight spells of six, one, and twenty-eight years respectively.

=== Stadiums and locations ===
Locations of the 2016–17 Premier League teams
Greater London Premier League football clubs

Note: Table lists in alphabetical order.

| Team | Location and County | Stadium | Capacity |
|---|---|---|---|
| Arsenal | London (Holloway) | Emirates Stadium | 60,432 |
| Bournemouth | Bournemouth | Dean Court | 11,464 |
| Burnley | Burnley | Turf Moor | 22,546 |
| Chelsea | London (Fulham) | Stamford Bridge | 41,623 |
| Crystal Palace | London (Selhurst) | Selhurst Park | 26,309 |
| Everton | Liverpool (Walton) | Goodison Park | 39,572 |
| Hull City | Kingston upon Hull | KCOM Stadium | 25,404 |
| Leicester City | Leicester | King Power Stadium | 32,500 |
| Liverpool | Liverpool (Anfield) | Anfield | 54,074 |
| Manchester City | Manchester (Bradford) | City of Manchester Stadium | 55,097 |
| Manchester United | Manchester (Old Trafford) | Old Trafford | 76,100 |
| Middlesbrough | Middlesbrough | Riverside Stadium | 35,100 |
| Southampton | Southampton | St Mary's Stadium | 32,689 |
| Stoke City | Stoke-on-Trent | Bet365 Stadium (Note: Stoke City announced that from the 2016–17 season onward, the Britannia Stadium would be renamed to the Bet365 Stadium.) | 28,383 |
| Sunderland | Sunderland | Stadium of Light | 49,000 |
| Swansea City | Swansea | Liberty Stadium | 20,972 |
| Tottenham Hotspur | London (Tottenham) | White Hart Lane | 32,000 (Note: Tottenham Hotspur played at White Hart Lane with a reduced capacity, due to the north east corner of the stadium being dismantled to help facilitate building works for their new stadium being built adjacently.) |
| Watford | Watford | Vicarage Road | 21,977 |
| West Bromwich Albion | West Bromwich | The Hawthorns | 26,500 |
| West Ham United | London (Stratford) | London Stadium (Note: West Ham United played for the first time at the London Stadium, formerly known as the Olympic Stadium.) | 57,000 (Note: Although having a capacity of 60,010, for the first Premier League game this was limited to 57,000 due to safety fears following persistent standing by fans at West Ham's Europa League game played in early August.) |

=== Personnel and kits ===
| Team | Manager | Captain | Kit manufacturer | Shirt sponsor |
|---|---|---|---|---|
| Arsenal | (France) Arsène Wenger | (France) Laurent Koscielny^{1} | Puma | Emirates |
| Bournemouth | (England) Eddie Howe | (England) Simon Francis | JD Sports | Mansion Group |
| Burnley | (England) Sean Dyche | (England) Tom Heaton | Puma | Dafabet |
| Chelsea | (Italy) Antonio Conte | (England) John Terry | Adidas | Yokohama |
| Crystal Palace | (England) Sam Allardyce | (England) Scott Dann | Macron | Mansion Group |
| Everton | (Netherlands) Ronald Koeman | (England) Phil Jagielka | Umbro | Chang |
| Hull City | (Portugal) Marco Silva | (England) Michael Dawson | Umbro | SportPesa |
| Leicester City | (England) Craig Shakespeare (caretaker) | (Jamaica) Wes Morgan | Puma | King Power |
| Liverpool | (Germany) Jürgen Klopp | (England) Jordan Henderson | New Balance | Standard Chartered |
| Manchester City | (Spain) Pep Guardiola | (Belgium) Vincent Kompany | Nike | Etihad Airways |
| Manchester United | (Portugal) José Mourinho | (England) Wayne Rooney | Adidas | Chevrolet |
| Middlesbrough | (England) Steve Agnew (caretaker) | (England) Grant Leadbitter | Adidas | Ramsdens |
| Southampton | (France) Claude Puel | (Northern Ireland) Steven Davis | Under Armour | Virgin Media |
| Stoke City | (Wales) Mark Hughes | (England) Ryan Shawcross | Macron | bet365 |
| Sunderland | (Scotland) David Moyes | (Republic of Ireland) John O'Shea | Adidas | Dafabet |
| Swansea City | (England) Paul Clement | (England) Leon Britton | Joma | BetEast |
| Tottenham Hotspur | (Argentina) Mauricio Pochettino | (France) Hugo Lloris | Under Armour | AIA |
| Watford | (Italy) Walter Mazzarri | (England) Troy Deeney | Dryworld | 138.com |
| West Bromwich Albion | (Wales) Tony Pulis | (Scotland) Darren Fletcher | Adidas | UK-K8.com |
| West Ham United | (Croatia) Slaven Bilić | (England) Mark Noble | Umbro | Betway |

- ^{1}Per Mertesacker was the official captain of Arsenal, but due to a season long injury, Laurent Koscielny filled in as playing captain.
- Additionally, referee kits were made by Nike, sponsored by EA Sports, and Nike had a new match ball, the Ordem Premier League.

=== Managerial changes ===
| Team | Outgoing manager | Manner of departure | Date of vacancy | Position in table | Incoming manager | Date of appointment |
|---|---|---|---|---|---|---|
| Manchester United | (Netherlands) Louis van Gaal | Sacked | 23 May 2016 | Pre-season | (Portugal) José Mourinho | 27 May 2016 |
| Southampton | (Netherlands) Ronald Koeman | Signed by Everton | 14 June 2016 | Pre-season | (France) Claude Puel | 30 June 2016 |
| Everton | (England) David Unsworth (England) Joe Royle | End of caretaker spell | 14 June 2016 | Pre-season | (Netherlands) Ronald Koeman | 14 June 2016 |
| Chelsea | (Netherlands) Guus Hiddink | End of caretaker spell | 30 June 2016 | Pre-season | (Italy) Antonio Conte | 1 July 2016 |
| Manchester City | (Chile) Manuel Pellegrini | End of contract | 30 June 2016 | Pre-season | (Spain) Pep Guardiola | 1 July 2016 |
| Watford | (Spain) Quique Sánchez Flores | Mutual consent | 30 June 2016 | Pre-season | (Italy) Walter Mazzarri | 1 July 2016 |
| Hull City | (England) Steve Bruce | Resigned | 22 July 2016 | Pre-season | (England) Mike Phelan | 22 July 2016 |
| Sunderland | (England) Sam Allardyce | Signed by England | 22 July 2016 | Pre-season | (Scotland) David Moyes | 23 July 2016 |
| Swansea City | (Italy) Francesco Guidolin | Sacked | 3 October 2016 | 17th | (United States) Bob Bradley | 3 October 2016 |
| Crystal Palace | (England) Alan Pardew | Sacked | 22 December 2016 | 17th | (England) Sam Allardyce | 23 December 2016 |
| Swansea City | (United States) Bob Bradley | Sacked | 27 December 2016 | 19th | (England) Paul Clement | 2 January 2017 |
| Hull City | (England) Mike Phelan | Sacked | 3 January 2017 | 20th | (Portugal) Marco Silva | 5 January 2017 |
| Leicester City | (Italy) Claudio Ranieri | Sacked | 23 February 2017 | 17th | (England) Craig Shakespeare | 12 March 2017 |
| Middlesbrough | (Spain) Aitor Karanka | Mutual consent | 16 March 2017 | 19th | (England) Steve Agnew (caretaker) | 16 March 2017 |

== League table ==
| Pos | Team | Pld | W | D | L | GF | GA | GD | Pts | Qualification or relegation |
|---|---|---|---|---|---|---|---|---|---|---|
| 1 | Chelsea (C) | 38 | 30 | 3 | 5 | 85 | 33 | +52 | 93 | Qualification for the Champions League group stage |
| 2 | Tottenham Hotspur | 38 | 26 | 8 | 4 | 86 | 26 | +60 | 86 | Qualification for the Champions League group stage |
| 3 | Manchester City | 38 | 23 | 9 | 6 | 80 | 39 | +41 | 78 | Qualification for the Champions League group stage |
| 4 | Liverpool | 38 | 22 | 10 | 6 | 78 | 42 | +36 | 76 | Qualification for the Champions League play-off round |
| 5 | Arsenal | 38 | 23 | 6 | 9 | 77 | 44 | +33 | 75 | Qualification for the Europa League group stage (Note: Arsenal qualified for the Europa League group stage by winning the 2016–17 FA Cup. As they had also qualified there by the virtue of their league position (5th), this spot was passed to the next-highest ranked team (6th), Manchester United.) |
| 6 | Manchester United | 38 | 18 | 15 | 5 | 54 | 29 | +25 | 69 | Qualification for the Champions League group stage (Note: Manchester United qualified for the Champions League group stage by winning the 2016–17 UEFA Europa League. Based on their league position (6th), they would have received the spot above to enter the Europa League group stage. This spot was vacated without replacement as per UEFA regulations.) |
| 7 | Everton | 38 | 17 | 10 | 11 | 62 | 44 | +18 | 61 | Qualification for the Europa League third qualifying round (Note: Manchester United, winners of the 2016–17 EFL Cup, initially attained a spot in the Europa League third qualifying round. That was passed to the next-highest ranked team in the league not already qualified for UEFA competitions (7th-placed Everton).) |
| 8 | Southampton | 38 | 12 | 10 | 16 | 41 | 48 | −7 | 46 | |
| 9 | Bournemouth | 38 | 12 | 10 | 16 | 55 | 67 | −12 | 46 | |
| 10 | West Bromwich Albion | 38 | 12 | 9 | 17 | 43 | 51 | −8 | 45 | |
| 11 | West Ham United | 38 | 12 | 9 | 17 | 47 | 64 | −17 | 45 | |
| 12 | Leicester City | 38 | 12 | 8 | 18 | 48 | 63 | −15 | 44 | |
| 13 | Stoke City | 38 | 11 | 11 | 16 | 41 | 56 | −15 | 44 | |
| 14 | Crystal Palace | 38 | 12 | 5 | 21 | 50 | 63 | −13 | 41 | |
| 15 | Swansea City | 38 | 12 | 5 | 21 | 45 | 70 | −25 | 41 | |
| 16 | Burnley | 38 | 11 | 7 | 20 | 39 | 55 | −16 | 40 | |
| 17 | Watford | 38 | 11 | 7 | 20 | 40 | 68 | −28 | 40 | |
| 18 | Hull City (R) | 38 | 9 | 7 | 22 | 37 | 80 | −43 | 34 | Relegation to EFL Championship |
| 19 | Middlesbrough (R) | 38 | 5 | 13 | 20 | 27 | 53 | −26 | 28 | Relegation to EFL Championship |
| 20 | Sunderland (R) | 38 | 6 | 6 | 26 | 29 | 69 | −40 | 24 | Relegation to EFL Championship |

Source: Premier League
Rules for classification: 1) Points; 2) Goal difference; 3) Goals scored; 4) Play-offs (only if needed to decide champion, teams for relegation or teams for UEFA competitions).
(C) Champions; (R) Relegated

== Results ==
| Home \ Away | ARS | BOU | BUR | CHE | CRY | EVE | HUL | LEI | LIV | MCI | MUN | MID | SOU | STK | SUN | SWA | TOT | WAT | WBA | WHU |
|---|---|---|---|---|---|---|---|---|---|---|---|---|---|---|---|---|---|---|---|---|
| Arsenal | — | 3–1 | 2–1 | 3–0 | 2–0 | 3–1 | 2–0 | 1–0 | 3–4 | 2–2 | 2–0 | 0–0 | 2–1 | 3–1 | 2–0 | 3–2 | 1–1 | 1–2 | 1–0 | 3–0 |
| Bournemouth | 3–3 | — | 2–1 | 1–3 | 0–2 | 1–0 | 6–1 | 1–0 | 4–3 | 0–2 | 1–3 | 4–0 | 1–3 | 2–2 | 1–2 | 2–0 | 0–0 | 2–2 | 1–0 | 3–2 |
| Burnley | 0–1 | 3–2 | — | 1–1 | 3–2 | 2–1 | 1–1 | 1–0 | 2–0 | 1–2 | 0–2 | 1–0 | 1–0 | 1–0 | 4–1 | 0–1 | 0–2 | 2–0 | 2–2 | 1–2 |
| Chelsea | 3–1 | 3–0 | 3–0 | — | 1–2 | 5–0 | 2–0 | 3–0 | 1–2 | 2–1 | 4–0 | 3–0 | 4–2 | 4–2 | 5–1 | 3–1 | 2–1 | 4–3 | 1–0 | 2–1 |
| Crystal Palace | 3–0 | 1–1 | 0–2 | 0–1 | — | 0–1 | 4–0 | 2–2 | 2–4 | 1–2 | 1–2 | 1–0 | 3–0 | 4–1 | 0–4 | 1–2 | 0–1 | 1–0 | 0–1 | 0–1 |
| Everton | 2–1 | 6–3 | 3–1 | 0–3 | 1–1 | — | 4–0 | 4–2 | 0–1 | 4–0 | 1–1 | 3–1 | 3–0 | 1–0 | 2–0 | 1–1 | 1–1 | 1–0 | 3–0 | 2–0 |
| Hull City | 1–4 | 3–1 | 1–1 | 0–2 | 3–3 | 2–2 | — | 2–1 | 2–0 | 0–3 | 0–1 | 4–2 | 2–1 | 0–2 | 0–2 | 2–1 | 1–7 | 2–0 | 1–1 | 2–1 |
| Leicester City | 0–0 | 1–1 | 3–0 | 0–3 | 3–1 | 0–2 | 3–1 | — | 3–1 | 4–2 | 0–3 | 2–2 | 0–0 | 2–0 | 2–0 | 2–1 | 1–6 | 3–0 | 1–2 | 1–0 |
| Liverpool | 3–1 | 2–2 | 2–1 | 1–1 | 1–2 | 3–1 | 5–1 | 4–1 | — | 1–0 | 0–0 | 3–0 | 0–0 | 4–1 | 2–0 | 2–3 | 2–0 | 6–1 | 2–1 | 2–2 |
| Manchester City | 2–1 | 4–0 | 2–1 | 1–3 | 5–0 | 1–1 | 3–1 | 2–1 | 1–1 | — | 0–0 | 1–1 | 1–1 | 0–0 | 2–1 | 2–1 | 2–2 | 2–0 | 3–1 | 3–1 |
| Manchester United | 1–1 | 1–1 | 0–0 | 2–0 | 2–0 | 1–1 | 0–0 | 4–1 | 1–1 | 1–2 | — | 2–1 | 2–0 | 1–1 | 3–1 | 1–1 | 1–0 | 2–0 | 0–0 | 1–1 |
| Middlesbrough | 1–2 | 2–0 | 0–0 | 0–1 | 1–2 | 0–0 | 1–0 | 0–0 | 0–3 | 2–2 | 1–3 | — | 1–2 | 1–1 | 1–0 | 3–0 | 1–2 | 0–1 | 1–1 | 1–3 |
| Southampton | 0–2 | 0–0 | 3–1 | 0–2 | 3–1 | 1–0 | 0–0 | 3–0 | 0–0 | 0–3 | 0–0 | 1–0 | — | 0–1 | 1–1 | 1–0 | 1–4 | 1–1 | 1–2 | 1–3 |
| Stoke City | 1–4 | 0–1 | 2–0 | 1–2 | 1–0 | 1–1 | 3–1 | 2–2 | 1–2 | 1–4 | 1–1 | 2–0 | 0–0 | — | 2–0 | 3–1 | 0–4 | 2–0 | 1–1 | 0–0 |
| Sunderland | 1–4 | 0–1 | 0–0 | 0–1 | 2–3 | 0–3 | 3–0 | 2–1 | 2–2 | 0–2 | 0–3 | 1–2 | 0–4 | 1–3 | — | 0–2 | 0–0 | 1–0 | 1–1 | 2–2 |
| Swansea City | 0–4 | 0–3 | 3–2 | 2–2 | 5–4 | 1–0 | 0–2 | 2–0 | 1–2 | 1–3 | 1–3 | 0–0 | 2–1 | 2–0 | 3–0 | — | 1–3 | 0–0 | 2–1 | 1–4 |
| Tottenham Hotspur | 2–0 | 4–0 | 2–1 | 2–0 | 1–0 | 3–2 | 3–0 | 1–1 | 1–1 | 2–0 | 2–1 | 1–0 | 2–1 | 4–0 | 1–0 | 5–0 | — | 4–0 | 4–0 | 3–2 |
| Watford | 1–3 | 2–2 | 2–1 | 1–2 | 1–1 | 3–2 | 1–0 | 2–1 | 0–1 | 0–5 | 3–1 | 0–0 | 3–4 | 0–1 | 1–0 | 1–0 | 1–4 | — | 2–0 | 1–1 |
| West Bromwich Albion | 3–1 | 2–1 | 4–0 | 0–1 | 0–2 | 1–2 | 3–1 | 0–1 | 0–1 | 0–4 | 0–2 | 0–0 | 0–1 | 1–0 | 2–0 | 3–1 | 1–1 | 3–1 | — | 4–2 |
| West Ham United | 1–5 | 1–0 | 1–0 | 1–2 | 3–0 | 0–0 | 1–0 | 2–3 | 0–4 | 0–4 | 0–2 | 1–1 | 0–3 | 1–1 | 1–0 | 1–0 | 1–0 | 2–4 | 2–2 | — |

Source: Premier League
Legend: Blue = home team win; Yellow = draw; Red = away team win.

== Season statistics ==
=== Scoring ===
==== Top scorers ====
| Rank | Player | Club | Goals |
|---|---|---|---|
| 1 | (England) Harry Kane | Tottenham Hotspur | 29 |
| 2 | (Belgium) Romelu Lukaku | Everton | 25 |
| 3 | (Chile) Alexis Sánchez | Arsenal | 24 |
| 4 | (Argentina) Sergio Agüero | Manchester City | 20 |
| 4 | (Spain) Diego Costa | Chelsea | 20 |
| 6 | (England) Dele Alli | Tottenham Hotspur | 18 |
| 7 | (Sweden) Zlatan Ibrahimović | Manchester United | 17 |
| 8 | (Belgium) Eden Hazard | Chelsea | 16 |
| 8 | (Norway) Joshua King | Bournemouth | 16 |
| 10 | (Belgium) Christian Benteke | Crystal Palace | 15 |
| 10 | (England) Jermain Defoe | Sunderland | 15 |
| 10 | (Spain) Fernando Llorente | Swansea City | 15 |

==== Hat-tricks ====
| Player | For | Against | Result | Date | Ref |
|---|---|---|---|---|---|
| (Belgium) Romelu Lukaku | Everton | Sunderland | 3–0 (A) | 12 September 2016 | |
| (Chile) Alexis Sánchez | Arsenal | West Ham United | 5–1 (A) | 3 December 2016 | |
| (England) Jamie Vardy | Leicester City | Manchester City | 4–2 (H) | 10 December 2016 | |
| (Venezuela) Salomón Rondón | West Bromwich Albion | Swansea City | 3–1 (H) | 14 December 2016 | |
| (England) Andre Gray | Burnley | Sunderland | 4–1 (H) | 31 December 2016 | |
| (England) Harry Kane | Tottenham Hotspur | West Bromwich Albion | 4–0 (H) | 14 January 2017 | |
| (Belgium) Romelu Lukaku^{4} | Everton | Bournemouth | 6–3 (H) | 4 February 2017 | |
| (England) Harry Kane | Tottenham Hotspur | Stoke City | 4–0 (H) | 26 February 2017 | |
| (Norway) Joshua King | Bournemouth | West Ham United | 3–2 (H) | 11 March 2017 | |
| (England) Harry Kane^{4} | Tottenham Hotspur | Leicester City | 6–1 (A) | 18 May 2017 | |
| (England) Harry Kane | Tottenham Hotspur | Hull City | 7–1 (A) | 21 May 2017 | |

Notes

^{4} Player scored 4 goals
(H) – Home team
(A) – Away team

=== Clean sheets ===
| Rank | Player | Club | Clean sheets |
|---|---|---|---|
| 1 | (Belgium) Thibaut Courtois | Chelsea | 16 |
| 2 | (France) Hugo Lloris | Tottenham Hotspur | 15 |
| 3 | (Spain) David de Gea | Manchester United | 14 |
| 3 | (England) Fraser Forster | Southampton | 14 |
| 5 | (Czech Republic) Petr Čech | Arsenal | 12 |
| 6 | (England) Tom Heaton | Burnley | 10 |
| 6 | (Spain) Joel Robles | Everton | 10 |
| 8 | (Poland) Artur Boruc | Bournemouth | 9 |
| 8 | (England) Lee Grant | Stoke City | 9 |
| 8 | (Belgium) Simon Mignolet | Liverpool | 9 |

=== Discipline ===
==== Player ====
- Most yellow cards: 14
  - (Greece) José Holebas (Watford)
- Most red cards: 2
  - (Uruguay) Miguel Britos (Watford)
  - (Brazil) Fernandinho (Manchester City)
  - (Switzerland) Granit Xhaka (Arsenal)

==== Club ====
- Most yellow cards: 84
  - Watford
- Most red cards: 5
  - Hull City
  - Watford
  - West Ham United

== Awards ==
=== Monthly awards ===
| Month | Manager of the Month | | Player of the Month | | Goal of the Month | | References |
| Month | Manager | Club | Player | Club | Player | Club | References |
|---|---|---|---|---|---|---|---|
| August | (England) Mike Phelan | Hull City | (England) Raheem Sterling | Manchester City | (Uruguay) Cristhian Stuani | Middlesbrough | |
| September | (Germany) Jürgen Klopp | Liverpool | (South Korea) Son Heung-min | Tottenham Hotspur | (England) Jordan Henderson | Liverpool | |
| October | (Italy) Antonio Conte | Chelsea | (Belgium) Eden Hazard | Chelsea | (France) Dimitri Payet | West Ham United | |
| November | (Italy) Antonio Conte | Chelsea | (Spain) Diego Costa | Chelsea | (Spain) Pedro | Chelsea | |
| December | (Italy) Antonio Conte | Chelsea | (Sweden) Zlatan Ibrahimović | Manchester United | (Armenia) Henrikh Mkhitaryan | Manchester United | |
| January | (England) Paul Clement | Swansea City | (England) Dele Alli | Tottenham Hotspur | (England) Andy Carroll | West Ham United | |
| February | (Spain) Pep Guardiola | Manchester City | (England) Harry Kane | Tottenham Hotspur | (Belgium) Eden Hazard | Chelsea | |
| March | (England) Eddie Howe | Bournemouth | (Belgium) Romelu Lukaku | Everton | (England) Andros Townsend | Crystal Palace | |
| April | (Argentina) Mauricio Pochettino | Tottenham Hotspur | (South Korea) Son Heung-min | Tottenham Hotspur | (Spain) Pedro | Chelsea | |

=== Annual awards ===
| Award | Winner | Club |
|---|---|---|
| Premier League Manager of the Season | (Italy) Antonio Conte | Chelsea |
| Premier League Player of the Season | (France) N'Golo Kanté | Chelsea |
| Premier League Goal of the Season | (Germany) Emre Can | Liverpool |
| PFA Players' Player of the Year | (France) N'Golo Kanté | Chelsea |
| PFA Young Player of the Year | (England) Dele Alli | Tottenham Hotspur |
| FWA Footballer of the Year | (France) N'Golo Kanté | Chelsea |

PFA Team of the Year
| Goalkeeper | (Spain) David de Gea (Manchester United) | | | |
| Defence | (England) Kyle Walker (Tottenham Hotspur) | (England) Gary Cahill (Chelsea) | (Brazil) David Luiz (Chelsea) | (England) Danny Rose (Tottenham Hotspur) |
| Midfield | (Belgium) Eden Hazard (Chelsea) | (England) Dele Alli (Tottenham Hotspur) | (France) N'Golo Kanté (Chelsea) | (Senegal) Sadio Mané (Liverpool) |
| Attack | (England) Harry Kane (Tottenham Hotspur) | | (Belgium) Romelu Lukaku (Everton) | |

== Attendances ==
| # | Football club | Home games | Average attendance |
|---|---|---|---|
| 1 | Manchester United | 19 | 75,290 |
| 2 | Arsenal | 19 | 59,957 |
| 3 | West Ham United | 19 | 56,972 |
| 4 | Manchester City | 19 | 54,019 |
| 5 | Liverpool | 19 | 53,016 |
| 6 | Chelsea | 19 | 41,508 |
| 7 | Sunderland | 19 | 41,287 |
| 8 | Everton | 19 | 39,310 |
| 9 | Leicester City | 19 | 31,893 |
| 10 | Tottenham Hotspur | 19 | 31,639 |
| 11 | Southampton | 19 | 30,936 |
| 12 | Middlesbrough | 19 | 30,449 |
| 13 | Stoke City | 19 | 27,433 |
| 14 | Crystal Palace | 19 | 25,161 |
| 15 | West Bromwich Albion | 19 | 23,876 |
| 16 | Hull City | 19 | 20,761 |
| 17 | Swansea City | 19 | 20,619 |
| 18 | Watford | 19 | 20,558 |
| 19 | Burnley | 19 | 20,558 |
| 20 | AFC Bournemouth | 19 | 11,182 |
