= N'Golo Kanté =

French footballer (born 1991)

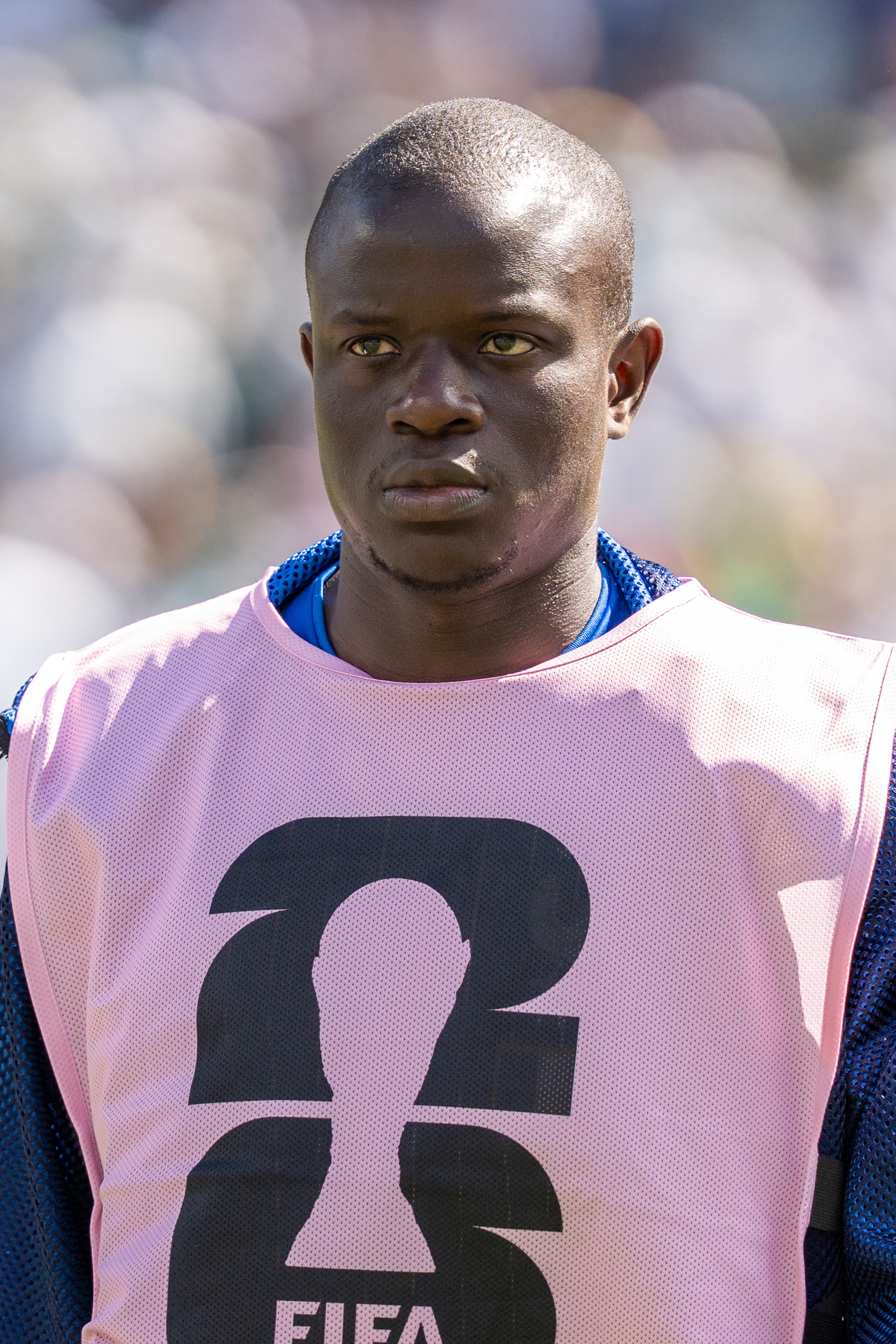
- Kanté with France in 2026

Personal information
- Full name: N'Golo Kanté
- Date of birth: 29 March 1991 (age 35)
- Place of birth: Paris, France
- Height: 1.68 m (5 ft 6 in)
- Position: Defensive midfielder

Team information
- Current team: Fenerbahçe
- Number: 91

Youth career
- 2001–2010: JS Suresnes
- 2010–2012: Boulogne

Senior career*
Years	Team	Apps	(Gls)
2012–2013	Boulogne	38	(3)
2013–2015	Caen	75	(4)
2015–2016	Leicester City	37	(1)
2016–2023	Chelsea	190	(11)
2023–2026	Al-Ittihad	79	(8)
2026–	Fenerbahçe	26	(2)

International career^{‡}
2016–	France	69	(2)
Medal record
Men's football
Representing France
FIFA World Cup
Winner	2018 Russia
UEFA European Championship
Runner-up	2016 France
- * Club domestic league appearances and goals as of 17:57, 21 November 2026 (UTC) ‡ National team caps and goals as of 23:00, 8 June 2026 (UTC)

N'Golo Kanté (born 29 March 1991) is a French professional footballer who plays as a defensive midfielder for Süper Lig club Fenerbahçe and the France national team. Regarded as one of the greatest defensive midfielders of all time, he is known for his stamina and work-rate on the pitch.

Kanté made his senior professional debut with Boulogne in 2012, appearing as a substitute in one Ligue 2 match, and played an entire season in the third division the following year. After that he joined Ligue 2 side Caen on a free transfer, finished third and won promotion to Ligue 1. He stayed with the club for one more year, where he helped lead the team to a mid-table finish. In 2015, Kanté joined Leicester City for a fee worth £5.6 million.

Kanté was an integral part of the Leicester City team that were surprise Premier League champions in 2016. That same year, he joined Chelsea for a fee worth £32 million and again won the league, making him the first outfield player to win consecutive English league titles with different clubs since Eric Cantona in 1992 and 1993. With Chelsea he won the FA Cup, the UEFA Europa League, the UEFA Champions League, the UEFA Super Cup, and the FIFA Club World Cup. After seven seasons with Chelsea, he left on a free transfer to Saudi club Al-Ittihad during the summer of 2023.

Individually, Kanté has been awarded the Premier League Player of the Season, the PFA Players' Player of the Year, the FWA Footballer of the Year, the UEFA Men's Midfielder of the year, and the Trophées UNFP for Best French Player Abroad twice.

Kanté made his senior international debut for France in 2016 and was included in the squad that finished runners-up at the 2016 European Championship. In 2017, Kanté was named the French Player of the Year, a first for a player from the Premier League in seven years, and twelve months later was a key member of the 2018 FIFA World Cup winning squad.

== Club career ==
=== Boulogne ===
Born in Paris to Malian parents, Kanté began his career at the age of eight at JS Suresnes, in the western suburbs of the capital, remaining there for a decade. According to assistant manager Pierre Ville, Kanté remained outside the radar of big teams because of his small stature and selfless styles of play. He was rejected from the academy at Clairefontaine during this time. During his last season with Suresnes, in Promotion d'Honneur (PH, French 9th senior level), he scored 10 goals. In 2010, after Arsenal manager Arsène Wenger passed on the offer of signing Kanté, Suresnes' president (one of Wenger's best friends) personally drove him around to visit different clubs. He joined the reserve team of Boulogne, and made his professional debut in the last game of the Ligue 2 season on 18 May 2012, a 1–2 home defeat for his already relegated team to Monaco. He replaced Virgile Reset for the final eleven minutes.

During the 2012–13 season, he played in the third-tier Championnat National, missing only one league game. On 10 August, he scored his first senior goal, the ony one in a win over Luzenac at the Stade de la Libération, and he added two more over the campaign.

=== Caen ===
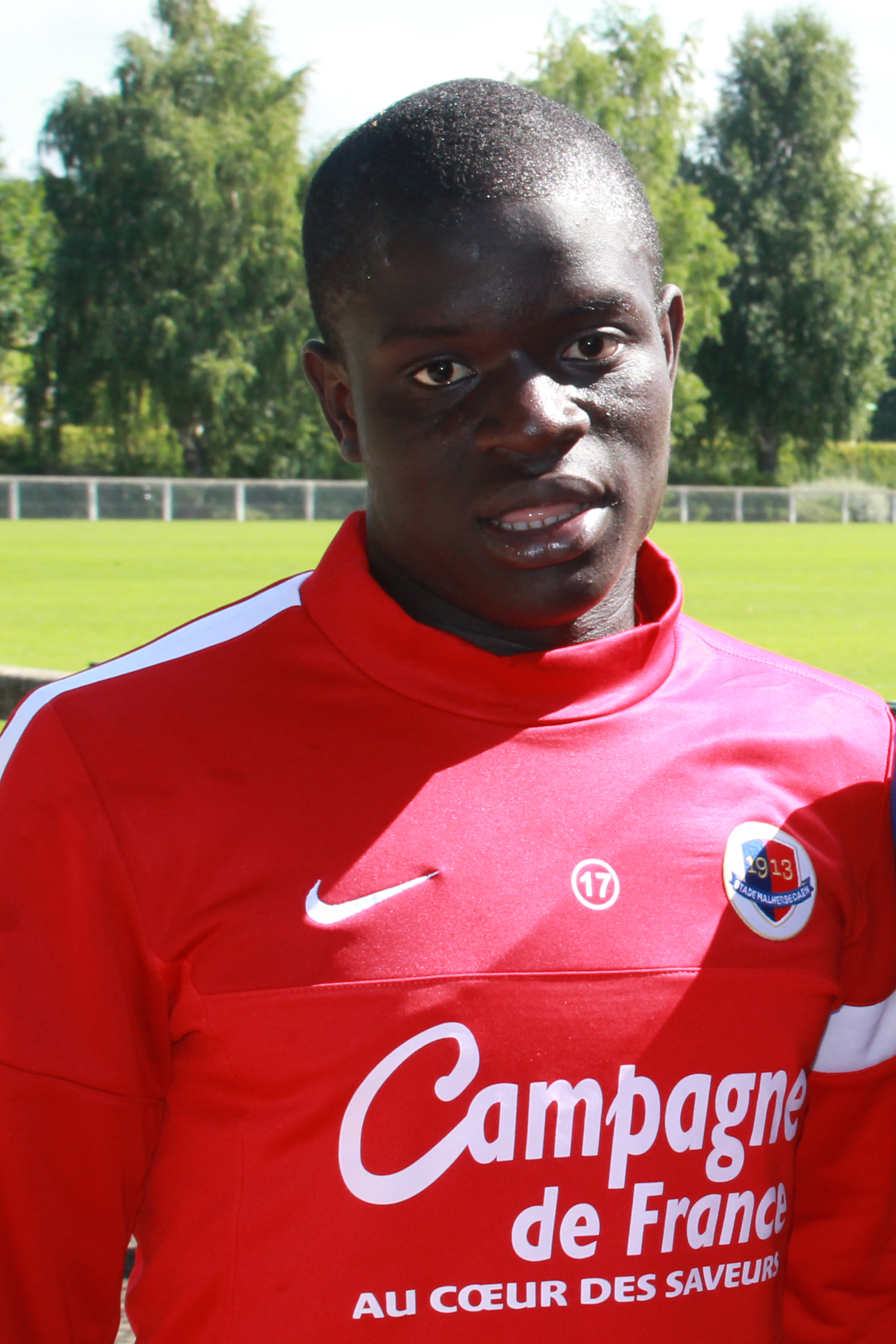
Kanté with Caen in 2013

In 2013, he joined Ligue 2 side Caen and played all 38 games in his first season as they came third in Ligue 2, earning them promotion to Ligue 1. In his second match on 9 August, he scored his first goal to equalise in a 2–1 win at Laval; he levelled again with his other goal of the campaign on 11 April 2014, in a 3–2 win at Istres.

The following season, Kanté played 37 games as Caen remained in the top flight; his one absence was suspension through being sent off in a 0–1 home loss to Rennes on 30 August. Three weeks earlier, he scored their first goal of the season in a 3–0 win at Evian. He recovered the ball more times over the season than any other player in Europe.

=== Leicester City ===
Kanté was scouted for Premier League club Leicester City by Steve Walsh, who had previously facilitated the transfers of Jamie Vardy and Riyad Mahrez to the team. He was identified as the successor to Esteban Cambiasso. On 3 August 2015, he joined Leicester on a four-year contract, for an undisclosed fee reported to be worth €8 million (£5.6 million). He made his debut five days later by replacing Vardy for the final eight minutes of a 4–2 home win over Sunderland. On 7 November, he scored his first Premier League goal, in a 2–1 home win against Watford.

He earned much praise and many plaudits for his consistently impressive displays for Leicester, and was widely considered to be a major factor in the club's excellent form as they went on to win the 2015–16 Premier League, consistently making a high number of tackles and interceptions. In April, he was one of four Leicester players named in the PFA Team of the Year. By the end of the season, Kanté had managed 175 tackles (31 more than any other player) and 157 interceptions (15 more than any other player), topping the defensive stats at the end of the 2015–16 Premier League season.

=== Chelsea ===
==== 2016–2018: League and FA Cup champion ====
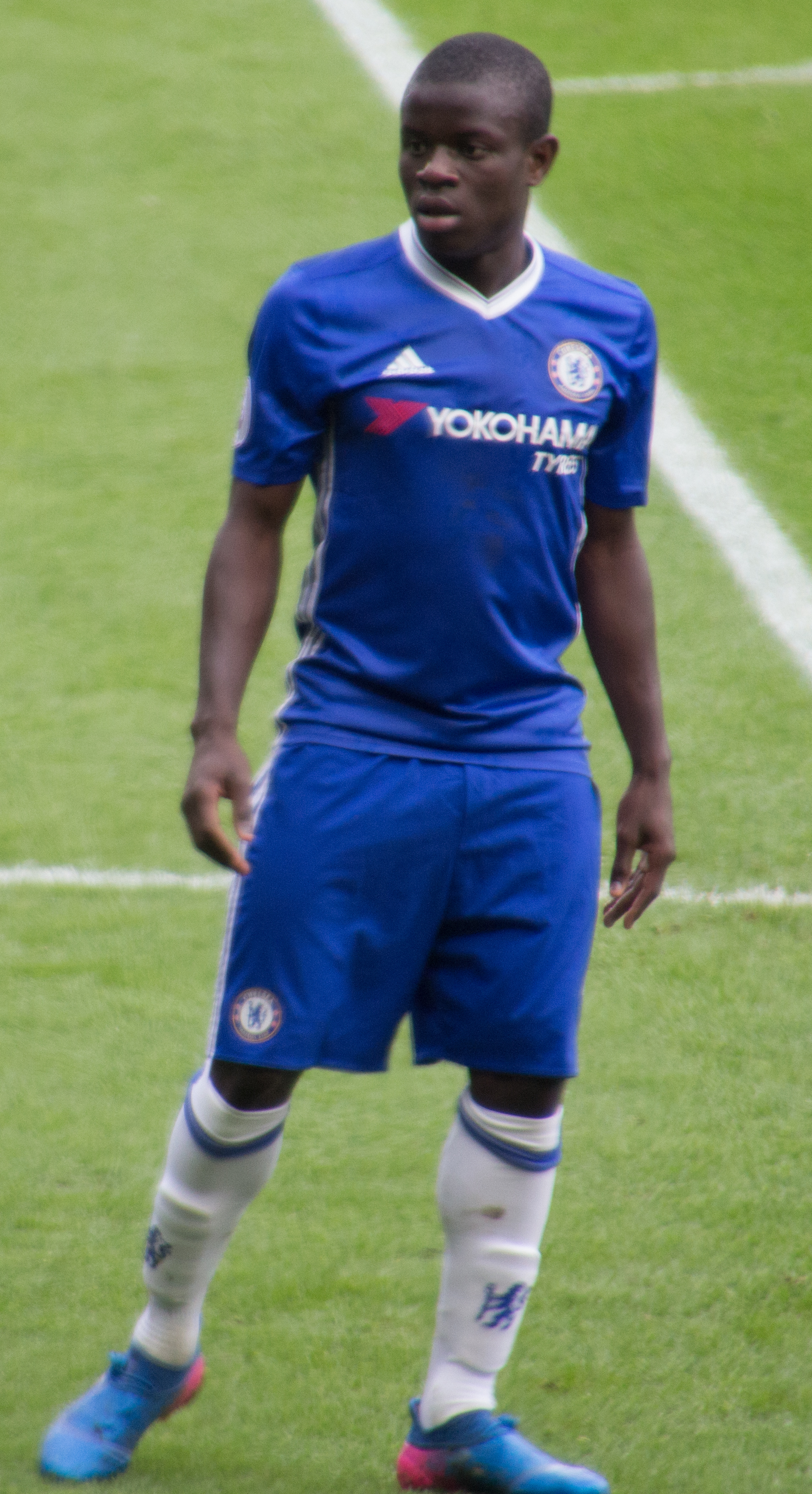
Kanté with Chelsea in 2017

On 16 July 2016, Kanté signed a five-year deal with Chelsea who reportedly paid £32 million in transfer fees. Arsenal allegedly backed out of the deal due to the agent fees involved, which totalled more than £10 million, instead opting to sign Granit Xhaka. Due to disputes arising from the sharing of agent fees, Kanté was reported to have been subject to death threats, a claim which he later denied. Kanté was given the number 7 shirt, left vacant since the exit of Ramires in January. According to Football Leaks, Chelsea offered to transfer a part of the salary into an offshore account to avoid taxes. Kanté refused; his lawyer stated in an email that "N'Golo is flexible, he simply wants a normal salary."

On 15 August 2016, Kanté made his competitive debut in their season opener against West Ham United. Despite picking up a yellow card in the first three minutes of the game, he shone as the game went on, to help Chelsea to a 2–1 victory. Three months after his move to London, he faced his former side Leicester City for the first time, and was Man of the Match in a 3–0 victory. On 23 October, he scored his first goal for Chelsea in a 4–0 home win against Manchester United.

On 26 December 2016, Kanté was named by L'Équipe as the world's sixth best footballer of 2016. On 13 March 2017, Kanté was named man of the match and scored the only goal in the 51st minute, in an FA Cup quarter-final win over Manchester United at Stamford Bridge. On 20 April, Kanté was named in the PFA Team of the Year for the second consecutive season. He was also later named the PFA Players' Player of the Year, the FWA Footballer of the Year, and the Premier League Player of the Season. Kanté become the first player since Eric Cantona in 1993 to win back‑to-back top-flight titles in England with two clubs. Kanté was nominated for the Ballon d'Or in October 2017. He would go on to gain an FA Cup winners medal, appearing for the whole 90 minutes in a 1–0 victory over Manchester United in the final on 19 May 2018. BBC Sport awarded him the man of the match award.

==== 2018–2023: European and World champion ====
He signed a new five-year contract at Chelsea on 23 November 2018, making him Chelsea's highest-paid player. Kanté scored the first goal of Chelsea's 2–1 EFL Cup semi-final second leg win at home to Tottenham Hotspur. The score was tied 2–2 on aggregate at the end of 90 minutes, with Chelsea winning the shootout 4–2. Kanté scored on his 300th club appearance, a 2–2 home draw against Burnley on 22 April. Despite not being fully fit, Kanté started the 2018–19 Europa League final and dominated Arsenal's midfield as Chelsea won 4–1.

Kanté started the 2019 Premier League campaign from the bench as Chelsea suffered a 4–0 away defeat to Manchester United. He had been out for almost a month including missing the Champions League opener against Valencia because of ankle injury. Kanté scored the only goal in a 1–2 loss against Liverpool at Stamford Bridge on 22 September 2019. His first goal of the season was nominated for the Premier League Goal of the Month award along with his Chelsea teammate Fikayo Tomori. Kanté marked his 150th Chelsea appearance with a goal against Manchester City, in a 1–2 away defeat on 23 November. Later that month Kanté revealed he decided against moving to PSG and said: "‘Sometimes we do not necessarily know where we want to go, but we know what we have." He said he felt good in London and had faith in the project at Chelsea.

In May 2020, during the COVID-19 pandemic, Kanté chose to train from home after Chelsea resumed training on site. The club supported his stance, even if he would miss the rest of the season. Kanté impressed in the Premier League opener against Brighton & Hove Albion, in a 3–1 away win on 14 September 2020.

He marked his 200th appearance in all competitions with the club 23 February 2021 as Chelsea beat Atlético Madrid 1–0 in the Champions League round of 16. Kanté was widely lauded for his performances against the Spanish sides, Atlético Madrid and Real Madrid, en-route to the final of the Champions League. He was named player of the match as he won his first UEFA Champions League after Chelsea defeated Manchester City 1–0 in the 2021 UEFA Champions League Final in Porto. Arsène Wenger described Kanté's performance as "unbelievable", and commentators argued that Kanté's performance in the Champions League put him in contention for the 2021 Ballon d’Or. In anticipation of the award, Kante said that "it's a great individual award for players, but I see it as the result of a season. It's not necessarily an objective I'm working on."

After Kanté's match-winning performances in Chelsea's run-up to the final of the 2020–21 UEFA Champions League season, several pundits proclaimed him as the apparent successor to former France and Chelsea player Claude Makélélé, who is considered to be one of the best defensive midfielders of all time. For his performances throughout the season, Kanté was named the UEFA Men's Midfielder of the year on 26 August 2021, but lost out to Chelsea teammate Jorginho in the UEFA Men's Player of the Year Award.

In later September 2021, Kanté tested positive for COVID-19 amid its pandemic, and was required to self-isolate for 10 days. On 8 October, Kanté was one of five Chelsea players included in the final 30-man shortlist for the 2021 Ballon d'Or. On 13 February 2022, he helped Chelsea to their first FIFA Club World Cup triumph in a 2–1 win over Palmeiras. On 14 August 2022, he suffered a hamstring injury during a match against Tottenham Hotspur, which kept him sidelined until April 2023.

=== Al-Ittihad ===
On 21 June 2023, Kante agreed to sign for Saudi Professional League club Al-Ittihad on 1 July upon the expiration of his Chelsea contract. On 14 August 2023, he made his debut with the team as a starter against Al Raed in a 3–0 Saudi Professional League away match win. On 18 September 2023, he made his AFC Champions League debut against Uzbekistan Super League club OKMK Olmaliq in a 3–0 home win. He finished his first season with Al-Ittihad with 4 goals and 6 assists in 46 matches in all competitions.

In 2024–25 season, he showed a very successful performance for Al-Ittihad, winning both the Saudi Pro League and King's Cup, and finishing the season with 4 goals and 4 assists in 35 matches in all competitions.

=== Fenerbahçe ===
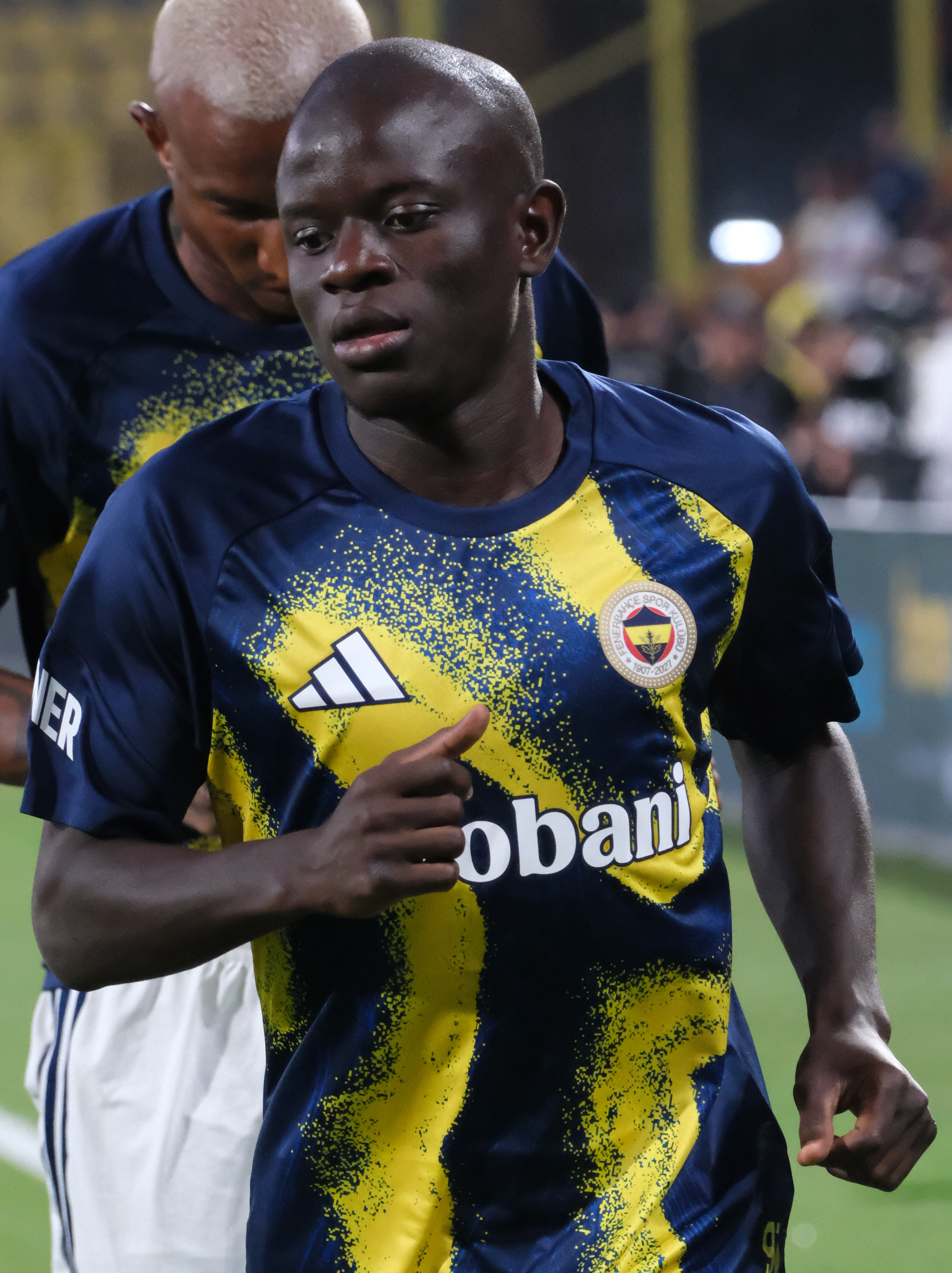
Kanté with Fenerbahçe in 2026

On 3 February 2026, Kanté agreed to sign for Süper Lig club Fenerbahçe until the end of 2027–28 season, after a transfer dispute regarding the submission of documents to FIFA. (Note: In early February 2026, Kanté was close to moving to Fenerbahçe in a high-profile swap deal that would have sent Youssef En-Nesyri to Al-Ittihad. The transfer initially collapsed on deadline day due to administrative errors by Al-Ittihad in the FIFA Transfer Matching System (TMS), with Fenerbahçe blaming the Saudi club for the failure. FIFA later intervened to resolve the TMS issues, allowing the move to go through.) He was traded with striker Youssef En-Nesyri. A week later, on 9 February, he made his debut in a 3–1 home victory against Gençlerbirliği.

On 19 February 2026, he made his continental debut with the team in UEFA Europa League match against Nottingham Forest. On 17 March, he scored his first goal with the team in a 4–1 Süper Lig win against Gaziantep.

== International career ==
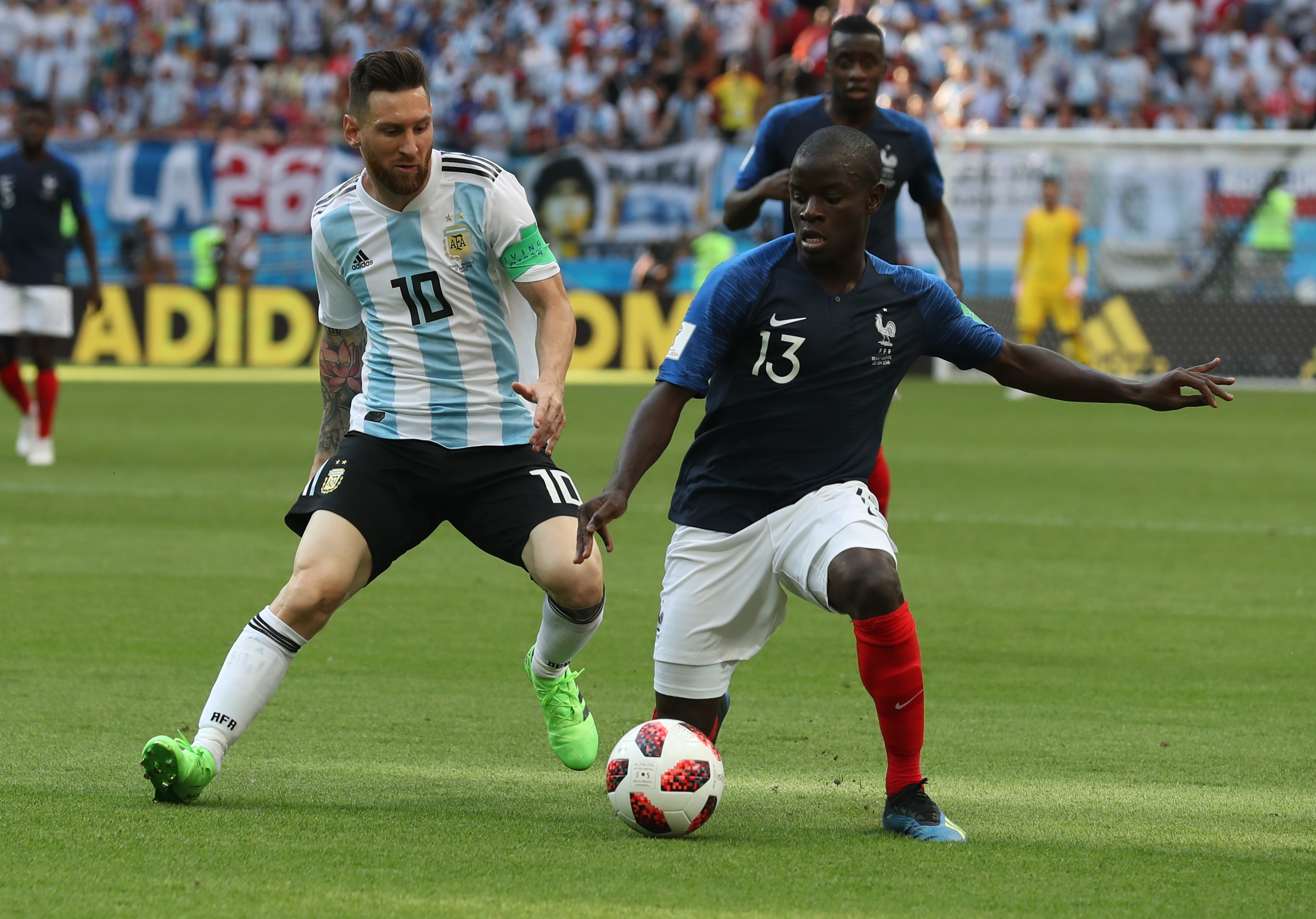
Kanté (right) duelling for possession with Argentina's Lionel Messi at the 2018 FIFA World Cup

Born to Malian parents, Kanté was approached by Mali ahead of the 2015 Africa Cup of Nations having not played for France in any of their age group teams. Kanté declined on the basis that he was still trying to establish himself in Ligue 1. Mali issued a further invitation to Kanté in January 2016, although he stated that he was still undecided about which national team to represent should he get an invitation from France.

On 17 March 2016, Kanté was selected for the France senior squad for the first time to face the Netherlands and Russia in friendlies. He made his debut against the former eight days later, replacing Lassana Diarra at half-time in a 3–2 win at the Amsterdam Arena. On his 25th birthday, 29 March, he made his first start and scored to open a 4–2 win over Russia at the Stade de France; fellow birthday celebrant Dimitri Payet also scored.

On 10 June 2016, Kanté appeared in his first competitive match for France by starting the opening match of UEFA Euro 2016 against Romania; he played the entire match, made the most passes, the most tackles, the most interceptions, covered the most distance on the pitch and assisted Dimitri Payet's winning goal in a 2–1 victory. In the round of 16 match against the Republic of Ireland at the Parc Olympique Lyonnais, Kanté picked up a yellow card in the 27th minute (his second of Euro 2016 which would cause him to be suspended from the quarter-final) and was replaced with Kingsley Coman in the 46th minute with the French trailing 0–1 at half time. Kanté was unused in the final, which France lost 1–0 to Portugal after extra time.

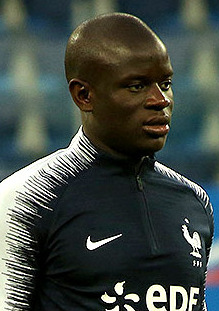
Kanté with France in 2018

On 17 May 2018, Kanté was called up to the 23-man French squad for the 2018 FIFA World Cup in Russia by manager Didier Deschamps. He featured in all seven matches for France in the tournament. He was awarded Man of the Match in a 0–0 draw against Denmark in the final group stage match on 26 June, and on 15 July, he started in France's 4–2 win over Croatia in the final of the tournament.

In May 2021, Kanté was called up to the France squad for the postponed Euro 2020. He would play every minute for the side before they were eliminated by Switzerland on penalties in the round of 16.

Kanté helped France win the 2021 UEFA Nations League, including scoring the only goal in their group stage victory against Portugal, but missed the semi-final and final due to contracting COVID-19. He also missed the 2022 World Cup as he was recovering from a serious hamstring injury.

On 16 May 2024, Kanté made his return to the France squad after he was selected by Deschamps for Euro 2024 in Germany. On 17 June, he was awarded player of the match in France's opening victory against Austria, a match in which he was also handed the captain's armband for the first time in the closing stages. Four days later, he achieved back-to-back player of the match honours following his performance in a goalless draw against the Netherlands. France's round of 16 victory over Belgium on 1 July was Kanté's twelfth consecutive match without defeat at the tournament, breaking the previous record set by Xavi for Spain. Kanté then became the first player to reach twenty consecutive matches unbeaten at major tournaments following a quarter-final win against Portugal on penalties four days later, a record also previously held by Xavi.

On 14 May 2026, Kanté was selected in France's 26-man squad for the 2026 World Cup. However, he failed to make a single appearance at the tournament, which France ultimately finished in fourth place.

== Player profile ==
=== Style of play ===
Kanté is known for his energy and ball-winning abilities as a defensive midfielder in the centre of the pitch. This is attributed to his positional sense, off the ball movement, and ability to read the game. Predominantly known for his tactical awareness, intelligence, anticipation, and the defensive aspect of his game—his ability to tackle and regain possession, intercept passes, and block shots—Kanté is also capable of playmaking from inside his own half and is an efficient passer on the counter-attack, helping kick start attacking plays immediately after winning back the ball. He is also quick up and down the pitch and often makes late attacking runs in to the box. A late bloomer, by the age of 21, Kanté had only made one senior appearance in the second tier of French football. He credits his calm and composed demeanor on the pitch to his gradual rise through three levels in the football league pyramid.

Kanté cites Lassana Diarra and Claude Makélélé, with whom he is often compared, as inspirations but insists he has his own style and approach towards the game, one which is unconventional and described as "false four", "relayeur", "carrilero", and "mezzala". His game is considered as, or tasked with, doing the "dirty work", which includes running, fetching, and retrieving possession. Though Kanté does not necessarily enjoy his role, he once said that "[the] satisfaction in recovering a ball, in protecting my team from an opponent's attack" is what keeps him going. Kanté made the most tackles in Europe's top leagues in back-to-back seasons (14–15 and 15–16). In his first 150 Premier League appearances he totaled 92 wins, 28 losses and 10 goals. During his time in the Premier League, he never received a red card.

Under Chelsea manager Maurizio Sarri, Kanté was deployed in a more advanced midfield role—one that he previously played in at Leicester—showcasing his effectiveness in possession and ball-carrying duties. In 2021, Tuchel restored Kanté in a "double six" holding midfield role to great effect, predominantly on the right-hand side, and usually partnered either by Jorginho or Mateo Kovačić. Kanté was effective in both disrupting an opponent's possession play in the final-third as well as springing swift counter-attacks from the midfield.

=== Reception ===
In April 2016, Alex Ferguson hailed Kanté as the best player in the Premier League, while the following year, former Chelsea midfielder Frank Lampard labelled him the best central midfielder in the world. His World Cup winning midfield partner, Paul Pogba, said he could outrun an entire team of 11 players. His league-title winning manager, Claudio Ranieri, often joked about him having "batteries" and said: "One day, I'm going to see you cross the ball and then finish the cross with a header yourself."

Thomas Tuchel, with whom Kanté won the 2020–21 Champions League, said: "If you play with N'Golo, you have half a man more; this is unique. It is a pleasure to be his coach, he is a big gift for me, a guy so, so humble and who is such a big helper on the pitch." Off the pitch, Kanté's former Chelsea manager, Antonio Conte, praised his work ethic and constant willingness to improve. A popular Internet meme that "70% of the planet is covered by water and the rest by N'Golo Kanté" exemplifies his standing among the fans and their recognition of his work ethic and reading of the game.

== Personal life ==
Kanté is a practicing Muslim. He was born in Paris to Malian parents who migrated to France from Mali in 1980. He grew up in a small apartment in Rueil-Malmaison, Hauts-de-Seine. His father died shortly after N'Golo turned 11 and his older sibling Niama died of a heart attack before the 2018 World Cup. He is named after King Ngolo Diarra of the Bamana Empire.

His younger sister was also in the youth system at Suresnes. Ronaldo, Ronaldinho, and Diego Maradona were his favourite players growing up. At the age of 21, while playing for Boulogne, he earned a diploma in vocational accounting.

At the start of his professional career at Boulogne, he commuted to training on a kick scooter and as of 2018 drove a Mini Hatch—his first purchase in England because he found it easy to learn to drive in. Kanté is aware of his public perception as a shy and private individual, but also said that stories about him by current and former teammates, like Jamie Vardy, were often exaggerated.

Kanté's nickname is "NG" and, outside of football, he enjoys playing tennis. His go-to karaoke song is Vegedream's "Ramenez la coupe à la maison". During his initiation at Chelsea, which he described as a "stressful moment", his teammates said he was not loud enough. His favourite dish is thieboudienne because of his mother's cooking.

On 28 June 2023, it was published that Kanté stepped into the world of club ownership in Belgium. He acquired Royal Excelsior Virton, a third-division team, from Flavio Becca, with the official transfer of ownership scheduled for 1 July.

== Career statistics ==
=== Club ===
As of match played 21 November 2026

Appearances and goals by club, season and competition
Club	Season	League			National cup (Note: Includes Coupe de France, FA Cup, King's Cup, Turkish Cup)		League cup (Note: Includes Coupe de la Ligue, Football League Cup/EFL Cup)		Continental		Other		Total	
Club	Season	Division	Apps	Goals	Apps	Goals	Apps	Goals	Apps	Goals	Apps	Goals	Apps	Goals
Boulogne	2011–12	Ligue 2	1	0	0	0	0	0	—		—		1	0
Boulogne	2012–13	Championnat National	37	3	2	1	0	0	—		—		39	4
Boulogne	Total		38	3	2	1	0	0	—		—		40	4
Caen	2013–14	Ligue 2	38	2	4	1	1	0	—		—		43	3
Caen	2014–15	Ligue 1	37	2	1	1	1	0	—		—		39	3
Caen	Total		75	4	5	2	2	0	—		—		82	6
Leicester City	2015–16	Premier League	37	1	1	0	2	0	—		—		40	1
Chelsea	2016–17	Premier League	35	1	5	1	1	0	—		—		41	2
Chelsea	2017–18	Premier League	34	1	5	0	2	0	6 (Note: Appearances in UEFA Champions League)	0	1 (Note: Appearance in FA Community Shield)	0	48	1
Chelsea	2018–19	Premier League	36	4	2	0	5	1	10 (Note: Appearances in UEFA Europa League)	0	0	0	53	5
Chelsea	2019–20	Premier League	22	3	1	0	0	0	4	0	1 (Note: Appearance in UEFA Super Cup)	0	28	3
Chelsea	2020–21	Premier League	30	0	4	0	1	0	13	0	—		48	0
Chelsea	2021–22	Premier League	26	2	3	0	4	0	6	0	3 (Note: One appearance in UEFA Super Cup, two appearances in FIFA Club World Cup)	0	42	2
Chelsea	2022–23	Premier League	7	0	0	0	0	0	2	0	—		9	0
Chelsea	Total		190	11	20	1	13	1	41	0	5	0	269	13
Al-Ittihad	2023–24	Saudi Pro League	30	2	4	1	—		6 (Note: Appearances in AFC Champions League)	0	6 (Note: Two appearances in Arab Club Champions Cup, two appearances and one goal in FIFA Club World Cup, two appearances in Saudi Super Cup)	1	46	4
Al-Ittihad	2024–25	Saudi Pro League	31	4	4	0	—		—		—		35	4
Al-Ittihad	2025–26	Saudi Pro League	18	2	2	0	—		5	0	1 (Note: Appearance in Saudi Super Cup)	0	26	2
Al-Ittihad	Total		79	8	10	1	—		11	0	7	1	107	10
Fenerbahçe	2025–26	Süper Lig	14	2	2	0	—		2	0	—		18	2
Fenerbahçe	2026–27	Süper Lig	12	0	0	0	—		7	0	—		19	0
Fenerbahçe	Total		26	2	2	0	—		9	0	—		37	2
Career total			445	29	40	5	17	1	61	0	12	1	575	36

=== International ===
As of match played 8 June 2026

Appearances and goals by national team and year
National team	Year	Apps	Goals
France	2016	13	1
France	2017	7	0
France	2018	16	0
France	2019	3	0
France	2020	5	1
France	2021	7	0
France	2022	2	0
France	2024	11	0
France	2025	1	0
France	2026	4	0
Total		69	2

As of match played 8 June 2026
France score listed first, score column indicates score after each Kanté goal

List of international goals scored by N'Golo Kanté
No.	Date	Venue	Cap	Opponent	Score	Result	Competition	Ref.
1	29 March 2016	Stade de France, Saint-Denis, France	2	Russia	1–0	4–2	Friendly	
2	14 November 2020	Estádio da Luz, Lisbon, Portugal	44	Portugal	1–0	1–0	2020–21 UEFA Nations League A	

== Honours ==
Caen

- Ligue 2 third place promotion: 2013–14

Leicester City

- Premier League: 2015–16

Chelsea

- Premier League: 2016–17
- FA Cup: 2017–18; runner-up: 2016–17, 2019–20, 2020–21, 2021–22
- UEFA Champions League: 2020–21
- UEFA Europa League: 2018–19
- UEFA Super Cup: 2021
- FIFA Club World Cup: 2021
- EFL Cup runner-up: 2018–19, 2021–22

Al-Ittihad

- Saudi Pro League: 2024–25
- King's Cup: 2024–25

France

- FIFA World Cup: 2018
- UEFA Nations League: 2020–21
- UEFA European Championship runner-up: 2016

Individual

- PFA Team of the Year: 2015–16 Premier League, 2016–17 Premier League
- ESM Team of the Year: 2015–16, 2016–17
- Leicester City Players' Player of the Year: 2015–16
- L'Équipe Team of the Year: 2016, 2017, 2018
- PFA Players' Player of the Year: 2016–17
- Premier League Player of the Season: 2016–17
- FWA Footballer of the Year: 2016–17
- Chelsea Players' Player of the Year: 2016–17
- Chelsea Player of the Year: 2017–18
- UNFP Best French Player Playing Abroad: 2017, 2018
- French Player of the Year: 2017
- FIFA FIFPro World11: 2018, 2021
- UEFA Team of the Year: 2018
- UEFA Europa League Squad of the Season: 2018–19
- Sports Illustrated Premier League Team of the Decade: 2010–2019
- UEFA Champions League Squad of the Season: 2020–21
- UEFA Champions League Midfielder of the Season: 2020–21

Orders

- Knight of the Legion of Honour: 2018
