= Jackie Carr (footballer, born 1891) =

English footballer and manager (1892–1942)

Personal information
- Full name: John Carr
- Date of birth: 26 November 1891
- Place of birth: South Bank, England
- Date of death: 10 May 1942 (aged 50)
- Place of death: Redcar, England
- Height: 5 ft 8 in (1.73 m)
- Position: Centre half

Senior career*
Years	Team	Apps	(Gls)
1908–1909	South Bank East End		
1909–1910	South Bank		
1910–1930	Middlesbrough	449	(81)
1930–1931	Blackpool	14	(2)
1931–1932	Hartlepools United	10	(1)

International career
1919–1923	England	2	(0)

Managerial career
- 1932–1935: Hartlepools United
- 1935–1938: Tranmere Rovers
- 1938–1942: Darlington
- * Club domestic league appearances and goals

John Carr (26 November 1891 (Note: Per 1939 register. Registered in Middlesbrough as March, 1892.) – 10 May 1942) was an English professional footballer. He made 449 league appearances for Middlesbrough, scoring 81 times. He was also capped twice for England.

== Playing career ==
=== Club career ===
Carr was born in South Bank, near Middlesbrough, the third of four brothers. His younger brother, George Carr, was also a professional footballer. Carr started at South Bank and played in the 1910 FA Amateur Cup final.

Carr signed a professional contract with his hometown club on 25 January 1911. He had four brothers, all of whom played for Middlesbrough: Walter and Harry, who signed as amateurs, and Willie and George, who both signed professional contracts for the club.

His debut came on 2 January 1911 against Nottingham Forest in a 2–2 draw. Carr scored both goals in front of a crowd of 15,000. That was the only appearance he made that season, his next game not coming until 27 January 1912. He made only three further appearances that season, scoring one goal. Carr made his mark the following season with 16 goals in 30 appearances, before going on to score 59 further times for Middlesbrough. He played a major role for Middlesbrough during their Second Division title wins in 1926–27 and 1928–29.

After 20 years of service to Middlesbrough, Carr was transferred to Blackpool on 14 May 1930, for the sum of £500. He spent a season at Blackpool before moving on to Hartlepools United in August 1931, firstly as player-coach and retired as a player in 1932. As a player-coach, Carr made ten appearances, scoring once for Hartlepools.

=== International career ===
Carr was capped twice for England. His debut, against Ireland in Belfast on 25 October 1919, ended in a 1–1 draw, and his second and final cap came four years later against Wales at Cardiff on 5 March 1923. The game finished 2–2.

== Managerial career ==
Carr started his managerial career as a player-coach at Hartlepools United in 1931. He was announced as acting manager following the death of Bill Norman. He was confirmed as Hartlepools' manager near the end of the 1931–32 season after a strong run of form. The following season, Hartlepools finished 14th in the Third Division North but conceded a club record 116 league goals. Carr also led Hartlepools to mid-table finishes in the two following seasons. With the club's finances in a poor position, Carr departed Hartlepools on 1 April 1935. He would subsequently spend 18 months as manager of Tranmere Rovers before returning to the North-East with Darlington (1938–1942).

On 10 May 1942, Carr died.

== Honours ==
=== As a player ===
South Bank

- FA Amateur Cup runner-up: 1909–10

Middlesbrough

- Football League Second Division: 1926–27, 1928–29
