= Nike Cachaña =

Nike football brand

- Type: Association football
- Inception: 2015
- Manufacturer: Nike

Nike Cachaña is an association football designed and manufactured by Nike. Based on the Nike Ordem, it was the official match ball for the 2015 Copa America.

== Overview ==
The name derived from Chilean Spanish language, the word cachaña referred to "dribbling", a colloquial term used in Chilean street football.

This ball is designed with white as its main appearance featured with blue and red applications, representing the host nation Chile. The colours of the Chilean flag make a statement in the design of this ball: the red representing the people, the blue symbolizing the Chilean sky, and the white for the Andes that so strongly define the geography of this country.

== See also ==
- Nike Ordem
