= Flavio Becca =

Luxembourgish real estate investor (born 1962)

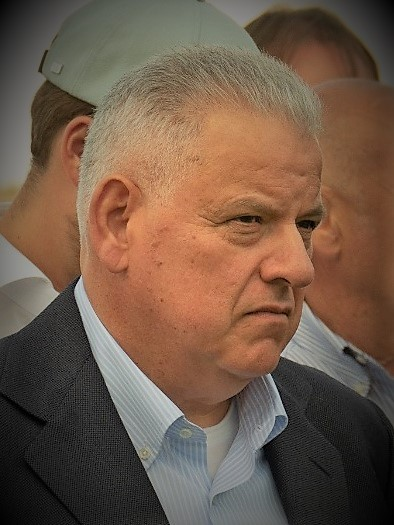
Flavio Becca (2023)

Flavio Becca (born 18 June 1962) is a Luxembourgish real estate investor and owner of Swift Hesperange, a Luxembourgish professional football club. He was previously the owner of Leopard Trek, a professional cycling team, until Trek took over ownership in 2014. He was also the owner of Belgian football club Royal Excelsior Virton, before selling the club to N'Golo Kanté in 2023.

== Biography ==
Becca is the son of Italian immigrants, he grew up in Hesperingen and lives in Luxembourg. Becca was described by The Guardian daily newspaper as a "real estate mogul". In the 1990s, Becca began sponsoring the Luxembourg football club F91 Dudelange. During Becca's tenure, Dudelange won Luxembourg championship titles. In 2011, Becca and his company Leopard SA founded the professional cycling team Leopard Trek. In 2019, Becca entered into discussions with the 1. FC Kaiserslautern, as he aimed to invest in the German football club.

== Career ==
Flavio Becca started supporting the Luxembourg football team F91 Dudelange in the 1990s. Dudelange won the Luxembourg championships when he was in charge. The professional cycling team Leopard Trek was established in 2011 by Becca and his business, Leopard SA. He also started talking to 1. FC Kaiserslautern in 2019 because he wanted to invest in the German soccer team. Prior to Trek assuming control of Leopard Trek in 2014, he was also the owner of the professional cycling team. He is the head of the Promobe Group, which is a significant player in the residential real estate development sector, offices, and the tertiary sector in the Grand Duchy of Luxembourg.

Becca invested in Olos, a €600 million real estate development fund that would later become the focus of a contentious legal dispute in 2014 over the division of assets with his co-investor. Becca asserted that he controlled 90% of the investment vehicle's underlying value, which his business partner contested because the arrangement called for an equal 50:50 split. Becca's tale has a recurring theme of a land grab with a bitter outcome. He designed a national sports stadium in Luxembourg with an attached shopping centre in the early 2000s. Livingen's plan was rejected by the then Prime Minister, Jean-Claude Junker, and shopping centre builder Rollinger, which had placed its faith in Becca's leadership as the principal developer, sued him.

Rollinger had good reason to believe in Becca: the elusive businessman had tight ties to prominent politicians and government officials in Luxembourg. Additionally, the planning department used unfair competition as a reason to rule against him when they handed down their final decision that he possessed the majority of the property on which the new stadium was to be constructed. It turned out that one of Becca's companies owed the state bank BCEE a sizable sum of money as well, much of which would have been used to fund the stadium since Becca didn't have the cash on hand for the project. While the nation's politicians may have shielded him to prevent his insolvency and the subsequent loss to state coffers, the successful stadium idea went a step too far into the spotlight. Before his eyes, Becca's network of supporters broke down.

The real year Becca's wings began to fall off was 2011, the same year his stadium bid was turned down. The police allegedly searched his residence and workspace on the basis of an embezzlement accusation. Prosecutors reportedly discovered many timepieces made by the Swiss-Italian manufacturer Anonimo, all in their original packaging, among other luxurious things, according to sources close to the investigation. The luxurious chest provided a small window into Becca's style, who is rumoured to be an investor in Anonimo as well as a high-net-worth customer of the jewellery shops in Knokke, a prominent Belgian seaside resort. According to reports, the skilled bricklayer is suspected of using expensive luxury goods to launder money, pay bribes, and "pay" invoices. Additionally, he is charged with using money from a business that he did not fully control to purchase these products for himself.

Finally, his professional cycling team, Leopard, failed to find a corporate sponsor in 2011, which cost Becca an estimated €15 million. Prior to the Tour de France, a third athlete failed a drug test, while two other crucial members of the squad crashed out. According to reports, he was formally charged with embezzlement and accused of using a business he co-owns, Kurt-Construction, to purchase luxury goods for himself, including wine, jewellery, firearms, and even property for a sizable hunting area in south Germany.

According to the German publication, BILD, Becca purchased the hunting property primarily for status reasons, to entertain members of the political elite in Germany and Luxembourg as well as several of his equally shady business colleagues. Many of his erstwhile allies have abandoned him due to rumours that he is "de facto bankrupt." It is unknown if he still develops properties or if he only engages in the numerous legal disputes he is involved in.

== Time with F91 Dudelange ==
Flavio Becca has a record of investing in sports leagues. He supported F91 Dudelange for a very long time and helped the team become nearly a perennial champion in Luxembourg; this season, they even made it to the group stages of the Europa League. The now-defunct professional cycling team Leopard Trek, which was founded around the Schleck brothers, was also initially backed by Becca.

Midway through the 1990s, when Flavio Becca first set foot in a Dudelange auto repair shop, he scarcely ever considered the possibility of one-day financing four football teams; a cycling team; a motorsports team; and the proprietor of an energy drink company. He was on his way to becoming one of the richest individuals in Luxembourg after growing the construction company his father had given him. Following a thorough and in-depth investigation, the advisory board decided to follow the management's proposal and accept Flavio Becca's current offer for a long-term and sustainable partnership during their meeting.

By chance, a member of F91 Dudelange worked at the dealership where Becca had previously shopped. Becca was persuaded to make an investment in the team by Damon Damiani, who went on to coach the merging club for a year. After seeing a game, the Inter supporter from the town of Hesperange decided to sign up for his first sponsorship. What happened next is well-known. In Luxembourg, the F91 won 15 championship titles, and in 2018, they made history by competing in the Europa League group stage. Becca, however, also experienced setbacks. His plan for a national football stadium and shopping centre in Livinglen finally fell through in 2011. Politics played a role in it. The years that followed included home raids, legal disputes with business associates, and a disastrous push into professional cycling.

== The Downfall ==
Flavio Becca reportedly received a €250,000 fine and a two-year prison sentence with credit for time served for misusing business funds. When tax officials informed the Public Prosecutor’s Office that many assets were being purchased through the entrepreneur’s businesses, the case was first brought to light in 2011. Following additional searches at Mr. Becca’s residence, authorities found and seized hundreds of expensive watches, with a combined estimated value of close to €18 million. Many of the watches were also ordered to be seized by the judge, and Mr. Becca would also be fined an additional €20,000 for any watches that could not be taken.

Before ordering the return, the court added, “The court warns Flavio Becca not to reoffend within five years from the date of this judgment,” — “of a certain number of seized objects”187 watches, which he claims he provided to members of his entourage, are among the 643 watches that belong to Promobe Finance. All other watches are also confiscated. The court may impose an additional fine of €20,000 per watch, or €3.74 million if they cannot be recovered. If this fine is not paid, Becca faces up to 3,600 days in prison, or another 200 days per watch, with a maximum sentence of ten years. The court has rejected Eric Lux, Becca’s former business partner, and his firm’s civil claims for damages.

The two Luxembourgish attorneys for the businessman chose not to respond to questions about it. The state’s attorney had requested a 42-month prison term and a €250,000 fine. The case started in 2011 when a search of a safe at Becca’s house took place after the prosecutor’s office received a warning from the tax administration about a significant amount of valuables being charged to Becca’s enterprises. The estimated value of the 900 watches that were seized — bought in a dozen different countries and kept in Becca’s personal safe — was €18 million.
