= James Baxter (footballer, born 1904) =

Scottish footballer

Jimmy Baxter
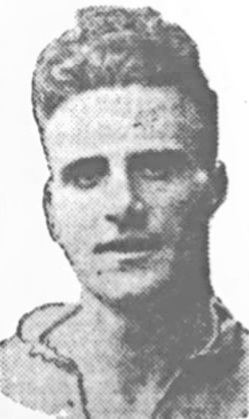
- Baxter around 1929

Personal information
- Date of birth: 1904
- Place of birth: Glasgow, Scotland
- Height: 5 ft 8 in (1.73 m)
- Positions: Wing half; midfielder

Senior career*
Years	Team	Apps	(Gls)
1923–1925	Parkhead		
1925–1929	Leicester City	6	(1)
1929–1930	Reading	0	(0)
1933–1934	Torquay United	0	(0)
1934–1936	Boston United	32	(1)
- * Club domestic league appearances and goals

James Baxter (born 1904, date of death unknown) was a Scottish professional footballer who played as a wing half.

== Career ==
Baxter was born in Glasgow, Scotland. He started his career with local team Parkhead, and was part of the team that won the 1923–24 Scottish Junior Cup, beating Baillieston Juniors after a replay. In August 1925, he was signed by English First Division side Leicester City. Making his debut on 24 April 1926, starting in a 4–0 defeat to Bury. Baxter struggled to get first team football, failing to make a single league appearance during the 1926–27 season. He would eventually return to the team in December 1927, starting three consecutive league games. Baxter scored his first on only goal for Leicester on 8 September 1928, coming in a 6–3 defeat to Liverpool at Anfield. Baxter was put on the transfer list by Leicester at the end of the 1928–29 season, and later joined Second Division club Reading.

He failed to make a single appearance for The Royals and ended up leaving after a single season. Baxter was signed by Third Division South club Torquay United in 1930, again failing to make any impact, he then joined newly-formed Boston United. He was a regular starter in the 1934–35 season but retired following 1935–36 season.

== Honours ==
Parkhead

- Scottish Junior Cup: 1923–24

Leicester City

- First Division: Runners-up 1928–29

Boston United

- Lincolnshire Senior Cup: 1934–35
