= Arthur Randle =

English footballer

Personal information
- Full name: Arthur John Randle
- Date of birth: 3 December 1880
- Place of birth: West Bromwich, England
- Date of death: 1913 (aged 32–33)
- Position: Goalkeeper

Senior career*
Years	Team	Apps	(Gls)
1898–1899	Lyng Rovers		
1899–1900	Oldbury Town		
1900–1901	Darlaston		
1901–1908	West Bromwich Albion	132	(1)
1908–1913	Leicester Fosse	123	(2)
Total		255	(3)
- * Club domestic league appearances and goals

Arthur John Randle (3 December 1880 – 1913) was an English footballer who played in the Football League for Leicester Fosse and West Bromwich Albion.
