= Jimmy Durrant (footballer) =

English footballer

Personal information
- Full name: Arthur Francis Durrant
- Date of birth: 1878
- Place of birth: Luton, England
- Date of death: 1927 (aged 48–49)
- Position: Winger

Youth career
- Luton Stanley

Senior career*
Years	Team	Apps	(Gls)
1897–1904	Luton Town	140	(27)
1904–1909	Leicester Fosse	140	(23)
1909–1913	Leyton		
1913–1914	Luton Town	15	(3)
- * Club domestic league appearances and goals

Arthur Francis Durrant (1878–1927), known as Jimmy Durrant, was an English footballer best known as a player for Luton Town and Leicester Fosse.

== Career ==
Durrant joined Luton Town in 1897 from local club Luton Stanley. He stayed with the club throughout their three-year spell in the Football League, and spent four further seasons with Luton Town in the Southern League before signing for Leicester Fosse in 1904.

After five years with Leicester, Durrant joined non-League Leyton, where he stayed for four seasons before rejoining Luton. He played a full season at the club, before retiring early in the 1914–15 season.
