= 1923–24 Bradford City A.F.C. season =

English football club season

The 1923–24 Bradford City A.F.C. season was the 17th in the club's history.

The club finished 18th in Division Two, and reached the 1st round of the FA Cup.

== Sources ==
- Frost, Terry (1988). Bradford City A Complete Record 1903-1988. Breedon Books Sport. ISBN 0-907969-38-0.
