= Roger Heywood =

English footballer

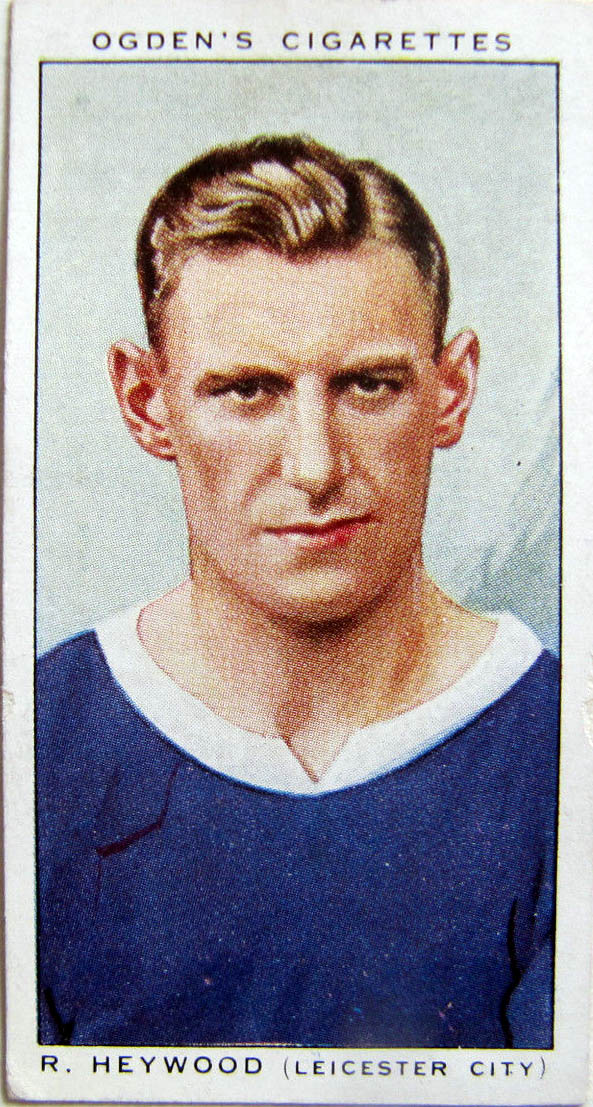

Personal information
- Date of birth: 4 May 1909
- Place of birth: Chorley, England
- Date of death: 1985 (aged 76)
- Height: 6 ft 1 in (1.85 m)
- Position: Defender

Senior career*
Years	Team	Apps	(Gls)
1929–1939	Leicester City	228	(2)
- * Club domestic league appearances and goals

Roger Heywood (4 May 1909 – 1985) was an English footballer who played in the Football League for Leicester City.
