= 1924–25 Bradford City A.F.C. season =

English football club season

The 1924–25 Bradford City A.F.C. season was the 18th in the club's history.

The club finished 16th in Division Two, and reached the 3rd round of the FA Cup.

== Sources ==
- Frost, Terry (1988). Bradford City A Complete Record 1903-1988. Breedon Books Sport. ISBN 0-907969-38-0.
