= Nike Ordem =

Nike football brand

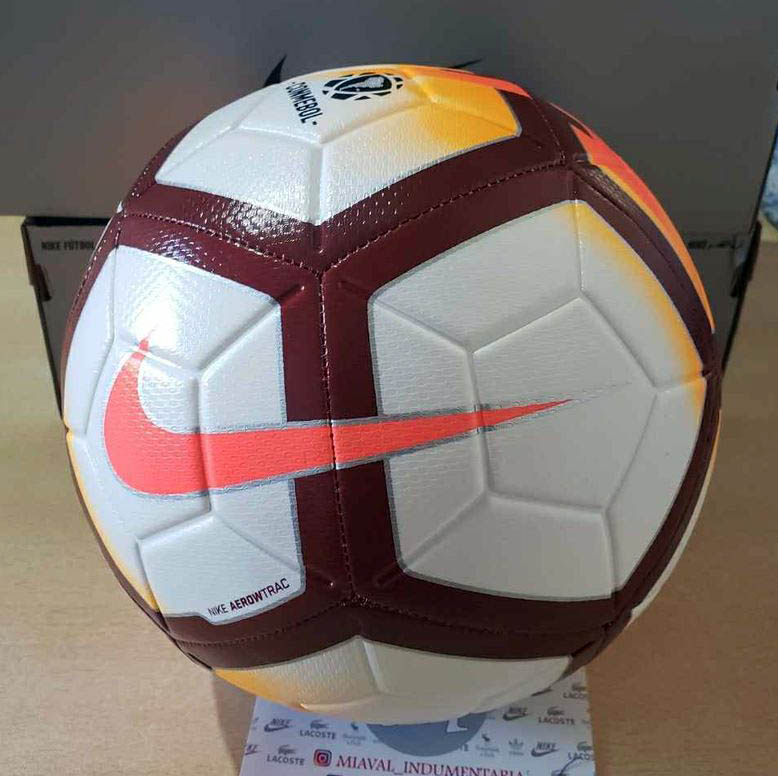
- Type: Association football ball
- Inventor: Nike, Inc.
- Inception: 2014; 12 years ago
- Manufacturer: Nike

The Nike Ordem is a brand of association footballs designed by Nike. The ball consists of 12 panel in a three-layer casing system, with traditional hexagonal and pentagonal patch patterns, similarly to Adidas' classic 1970 Telstar design.

== Overview ==
The Ordem, released in 2014, is the first Nike football to have panels bonded together, rather than stitched. It is claimed to be rounder and to perform more uniformly regardless of where it is hit, and being almost waterproof. Another change introduced by the Ordem was its decorative drawing, named "Radar Rapid Decision and Response", to make the ball more visible for players during the game.

Variations of the design have been produced for various competitions including the Premier League (since 2015), Serie A, La Liga, Campeonato Brasileiro Série A, the National Women's Soccer League, the 2015 AFC Asian Cup, the 2015 Copa Libertadores, 2015 Copa América (Nike Cachaña) and Copa América Centenario (Nike Ordem Ciento).
