= Pat Carrigan =

Scottish footballer

Personal information
- Full name: Patrick Carrigan
- Date of birth: 5 July 1898
- Place of birth: Cleland, North Lanarkshire, Scotland
- Date of death: 1957 (aged 58–59)
- Position: Defender

Senior career*
Years	Team	Apps	(Gls)
1922–1923	Douglas Water Thistle		
1923–1930	Leicester City	75	(3)
1930–1933	Sheffield United	52	(0)
1933–1934	Southend United	0	(0)
1934	Hinckley United		
Total		127	(3)
- * Club domestic league appearances and goals

Patrick Carrigan (5 July 1898 – 1957) was a Scottish footballer who played in the Football League for Leicester City and Sheffield United.
