= Herbert Bown =

English footballer

Personal information
- Full name: Herbert Arthur Bown
- Date of birth: 3 May 1893
- Place of birth: East Ham, England
- Date of death: 1959 (aged 65–66)
- Position: Goalkeeper

Senior career*
Years	Team	Apps	(Gls)
1908–1909	Squirrels Heath		
1909–1910	Roneo Works		
1911–1912	Romford Town		
1913–1922	Leicester City	143	(0)
1922–1924	Halifax Town	80	(1)
1924–1925	Hull City	4	(0)
Total		227	(1)
- * Club domestic league appearances and goals

Herbert Arthur Bown (3 May 1893 – 1959) was an English footballer who played in the Football League for Halifax Town, Hull City and Leicester City.
