= Billy Barrett =

English footballer

Personal information
- Full name: William Henry Barrett
- Date of birth: 3 August 1893
- Place of birth: Stockingford, England
- Date of death: 1962 (aged 68–69)
- Position: Full-back

Senior career*
Years	Team	Apps	(Gls)
1910–1911	Stockingford Congregationals		
1911–1912	Bromsgrove Rovers		
1912–1915	Nuneaton Town		
1919–1925	Leicester City	143	(1)
1925–1926	Derby County	0	(0)
1926	Hinckley United		
1927	Hereford United		
Total		143	(1)
- * Club domestic league appearances and goals

William Henry Barrett (3 August 1893 – 1979) was an English footballer who played in the Football League for Leicester City.
