= Reg Osborne =

English footballer (1898–1977)

Personal information
- Full name: Reginald Osborne
- Date of birth: 23 July 1898
- Place of birth: Wynberg, Cape Colony
- Date of death: 1977 (aged 78–79)
- Height: 5 ft 10 1/2 in (1.79 m)
- Position: Full-back

Senior career*
Years	Team	Apps	(Gls)
- Bromley
- Watling Street Boot Company
1923–1931	Leicester City	240	(2)
- Folkestone

International career
1927	England	1	(0)
- * Club domestic league appearances and goals

Reginald Osborne (23 July 1898 – 1977) was a professional footballer who played as a full-back for Leicester City in the 1920s. Born in South Africa, he also made one appearance for England.

== Playing career ==
During his career at Leicester he made a total of 249 appearances and was a member of the side which won the Second Division title in 1925. His solitary England appearance came in a 2–1 defeat by Wales on 28 November 1927, in which there were two own goals and a missed penalty (by Roy Goodall).

== Personal life ==
Osborne was born in Wynberg, Cape Colony. He had two brothers who also played in the Football League. Harold made one appearance for Norwich City whilst Frank was a centre-forward with Fulham, Tottenham Hotspur and Southampton, who made four England appearances.

== Honours ==
Leicester City

- Football League Second Division: 1924–25

== See also ==
- List of England international footballers born outside England
