= Jim McLaren =

Scottish footballer (1897–1975)

Personal information
- Date of birth: 12 July 1897
- Place of birth: Falkirk, Scotland
- Date of death: 16 November 1975 (aged 78)
- Place of death: Leicester, England
- Position: Goalkeeper

Youth career
- Bonnybridge Heatherbell

Senior career*
Years	Team	Apps	(Gls)
1919–1922	Stenhousemuir	37	(0)
1922–1927	Bradford City	155	(0)
1927–1933	Leicester City	170	(0)
1933–1939	Watford	194	(0)

International career
- Scotland schools
- * Club domestic league appearances and goals

James McLaren (12 July 1897 – 16 November 1975) was a Scottish professional footballer. He played as a goalkeeper.

== Career ==
Born in Falkirk, Stirlingshire, McLaren was Scotland's goalkeeper in their first ever schools international match, against England.

During his senior career, McLaren played in Scottish football for Bonnybridge Heatherbell and Stenhousemuir, initially in the Central League. His last season at Stenhousemuir was 1921–22, the club's first ever season in the Scottish Football League. In May 1922 McLaren transferred to English club Bradford City. He played for them for five seasons, before spending a further six at fellow Football League club Leicester City.

McLaren joined Watford in October 1933, aged 36. Under the management of Neil McBain and latterly Bill Findlay, he made 194 appearances in the Third Division South, 14 in the FA Cup and 18 in the Third Division South Cup. Prior to McLaren's arrival, Watford's best finish in the division was sixth place. By contrast, during McLaren's five full seasons at the club, Watford finished fourth three times, fifth once and sixth once. Aged 40, McLaren kept goal as Watford won the 1937 Third Division South Cup.

McLaren died in Leicester on 16 November 1975, aged 78.
