= John Brown (footballer, born 1901) =

English footballer

Personal information
- Full name: John Thomas Brown
- Date of birth: 15 June 1901
- Place of birth: Eastwood, Nottinghamshire, England
- Date of death: 1966 (aged 64–65)
- Position: Full back

Senior career*
Years	Team	Apps	(Gls)
1922–1931	Leicester City	114	(0)
1931–1934	Wrexham	87	(0)
1934–1936	Nuneaton Town		
1936–19??	Heanor Town		
- * Club domestic league appearances and goals

John Thomas Brown (15 June 1901 – 1977) was an English footballer. He played as a full back for Leicester City, Wrexham, Nuneaton Town and Heanor Town.

He was part of the Leicester City side which finished in what was until 2016 the club's highest ever league finish, of runners-up in 1928-29.
