= George Carr (footballer) =

English footballer and manager

Personal information
- Full name: George Carr
- Date of birth: 9 January 1899
- Place of birth: South Bank, Middlesbrough
- Height: 5 ft 9 in (1.75 m)
- Position: Centre half

Senior career*
Years	Team	Apps	(Gls)
1916–1919	Bradford Park Avenue		
1919–1924	Middlesbrough	67	(23)
1924–1932	Leicester City	179	(24)
1932–1933	Stockport County	18	
1933–1935	Nuneaton Borough		

Managerial career
- 1933–1935: Nuneaton Borough (player/manager)
- 1935–1937: Cheltenham Town
- * Club domestic league appearances and goals

George Carr (born 9 January 1899) was an English football player and manager. He played as a centre half for Bradford Park Avenue, Middlesbrough, Leicester City, Stockport County and as player/manager for Nuneaton Borough, he also managed Cheltenham Town from 1935 to 1937.

Carr was the youngest of four brothers from South Bank, Middlesbrough. His brother Jackie Carr was also a professional footballer.

George Carr was part of the Leicester City side that finished in the club's highest ever league finish in 1928-29 and briefly captained that side in Johnny Duncan's absence through injury. A broken leg he received in a game against Leeds United in 1925-26 was so severe, several supporters fainted on sight of it and had to be revived with salts water.
