= Leonard Barry =

English footballer (1901–1970)

Personal information
- Full name: Leonard James Barry
- Date of birth: 27 October 1901
- Place of birth: Nottingham, England
- Date of death: 17 April 1970 (aged 68)
- Place of death: Basford, Nottinghamshire, England
- Height: 5 ft 8 in (1.73 m)
- Position: Outside left

Senior career*
Years	Team	Apps	(Gls)
1920–1927	Notts County	148	(10)
1927–1932	Leicester City	203	(25)
1933–1934	Nottingham Forest	17	(1)

International career
1928–1929	England	5	(0)
- * Club domestic league appearances and goals

Leonard James Barry (27 October 1901 – 17 April 1970) was an English footballer who played at both professional and international levels as an outside left.

== Career ==
Barry was born in Sneinton, Nottingham. He played professional club football for Notts County, Leicester City and Nottingham Forest. At Nottingham Forest, Barry scored one goal in 17 games in the Football League.

He also earned five caps for the England national side between 1928 and 1929.
