= List of Leicester City F.C. records and statistics =

This article collates key records and statistics relating to Leicester City F.C., including information on honours, player appearances and goals, matches, sequences, internationals, season records, opponents and attendances.

== Honours ==
League

- First Division / Premier League (level 1)
  - Champions: 2015–16
  - Runners-up: 1928–29
- Second Division / First Division / Championship (level 2)
  - Champions (8, record): 1924–25, 1936–37, 1953–54, 1956–57, 1970–71, 1979–80, 2013–14, 2023–24
  - Runners-up: 1907–08, 2002–03
  - Play-off winners: 1994, 1996
- League One (level 3)
  - Champions: 2008–09

Cup

- FA Cup
  - Winners: 2020–21
  - Runners-up: 1948–49, 1960–61, 1962–63, 1968–69
- League Cup
  - Winners: 1963–64, 1996–97, 1999–2000
  - Runners-up: 1964–65, 1998–99
- FA Charity Shield / FA Community Shield
  - Winners: 1971, 2021
  - Runners-up: 2016

== Appearances ==
=== Most appearances ===
- **All-time most appearances** (Does not include wartime appearances)

Current players in bold.

#	Nat.	Name	Period	League	FA Cup	League Cup	Other	Total
1	(England)	Graham Cross	1961–1975	498	59	40	3	600
2	(Scotland)	Adam Black	1920–1935	528	29	0	0	557
3	(England)	Jamie Vardy	2012–2025	440	20	19	21	500
4	(Denmark)	Kasper Schmeichel	2011–2022	414	21	12	32	479
5	(England)	Hugh Adcock	1923–1935	434	26	0	0	460
5	(England)	Mark Wallington	1972–1985	412	25	23	0	460
7	(England)	Steve Walsh	1986–2000	369	17	41	23	450
8	(England)	Arthur Chandler	1923–1935	393	26	0	0	419
9	(Scotland)	John Sjoberg	1958–1973	335	44	34	1	414
10	(Wales)	Mal Griffiths	1939–1956	373	36	0	0	409

- Most appearances – **600** by Graham Cross (29 April 1961 – 23 August 1975)
- Most league appearances – **528** by Adam Black (24 January 1920 – 9 February 1935)
- Most appearances in the first tier (Premier League and predecessors) – **414** by Graham Cross
- Most appearances in the second tier (Championship and predecessors) – **304** by Mal Griffiths
- Most appearances in the third tier (League One and predecessors) – **46** by Matty Fryatt
- Most FA Cup appearances – **59** by Graham Cross (8 January 1963 – 24 February 1975)
- Most League Cup appearances – **40** by Graham Cross (26 September 1962 – 8 October 1974) and Steve Walsh (23 September 1986 – 25 January 2000)
- Most appearances in a single season – **61** by Gary Mills (46 in FL, 3 PO, 2 FAC, 4 FLC, 6 FMC) (1991–92)

=== Consecutive appearances ===
- Most consecutive appearances – **331** by Mark Wallington (4 January 1975 – 6 March 1982)
- Most consecutive League appearances – **294** by Mark Wallington (11 January 1975 – 2 March 1982)
- Most consecutive FA Cup appearances – **52** by Graham Cross – (14 January 1965 – 24 February 1975)
- Most consecutive League Cup appearances – **21** by John Sjoberg (15 January 1964 – 4 September 1968) and Mark Wallington (9 September 1975 – 9 October 1984)

=== Youngest and oldest appearances ===
- Longest Spell at club – **19 years 249 days** by Sep Smith (31 August 1929 – 7 May 1949))
- Youngest first-team player – **15 years 203 days** by Ashley Chambers (v Blackpool, 15 September 2005)
- Oldest first-team player – **43 years 21 days** by Mark Schwarzer (v Hull City, 27 October 2015)
- Oldest debutant – **42 years 111 days** by Mark Schwarzer (v Tottenham, 24 January 2015)

== Goalscorers ==
=== Top goalscorers ===
- **Top 10 all-time top goalscorers** (Does not include wartime appearances.) Current players in **bold**.

#	Nat.	Name	Period	League	FA Cup	League Cup	Other	Total	Apps	Goal Ratio
1	(England)	Arthur Chandler	1923–1935	259	14	0	0	273	419	0.65
2	(England)	Arthur Rowley	1950–1958	251	14	0	0	265	321	0.83
3	(England)	Jamie Vardy	2012–2025	183	4	8	5	200	500	0.40
4	(England)	Ernie Hine	1926–1932	148	8	0	0	156	259	0.60
5	(England)	Derek Hines	1948–1961	116	1	0	0	117	317	0.37
6	(Scotland)	Arthur Lochhead	1925–1934	106	8	0	0	114	320	0.36
7	(England)	Gary Lineker	1978–1985	95	6	2	0	103	216	0.47
8	(England)	Mike Stringfellow	1962–1975	82	7	8	0	97	344	0.28
9	(Scotland)	Johnny Duncan	1922–1930	88	7	0	0	95	295	0.32
10	(Scotland)	Jimmy Walsh	1956–1964	80	5	5	2	92	199	0.46

- Most goals – **273** by Arthur Chandler
- Most league goals – **259** by Arthur Chandler
- Most goals in the first tier (Premier League and predecessors) – **203** by Arthur Chandler
- Most goals in the second tier (Championship and predecessors) – **208** by Arthur Rowley
- Most goals in the third tier (League One and predecessors) - **27** by Matty Fryatt
- Most FA Cup goals – **14** by Arthur Chandler and Arthur Rowley
- Most League Cup goals – **8** by Mike Stringfellow and Jamie Vardy
- Most UEFA Champions League goals – **4** by Riyad Mahrez
- Most UEFA Cup/Europa League goals – **5** by Patson Daka
- Most UEFA Conference League goals – **3** by James Maddison
- Most European goals - **6** by Harvey Barnes James Maddison and Patson Daka

=== Top goalscorers in individual matches and seasons ===
- Most goals scored in a single season – **44** by Arthur Rowley (1956–57)
- Most goals scored in a season in the first tier (Premier League and predecessors) – **34** by Arthur Chandler (1927–28 and 1928–29)
- Most goals scored in a season in the second tier (Championship and predecessors) – **44** by Arthur Rowley (1956–57)
- Most goals scored in a season in the third tier (League One and predecessors) – **27** by Matty Fryatt (2008–09)
- Most goals scored in one game – **6** by Johnny Duncan (v Port Vale, 25 December 1924) and Arthur Chandler (v Portsmouth, 20 October 1928)
- Most goals scored on debut – **4** by Archie Gardiner (v Portsmouth, 21 February 1934)

=== Other goalscoring records ===
- Most consecutive games scored in – **8** by Arthur Chandler (6 December 1924 – 10 January 1925) and by Jamie Vardy (19 October 2019 – 8 December 2019)
- Most consecutive league games scored in – **11** by Jamie Vardy (29 August 2015 – 28 November 2015)
- Most hat-tricks (or better) – **17** by Arthur Chandler (12x3, 1x4, 3x5, 1x6)
- Most penalties scored – **41** by Arthur Rowley
- Youngest goalscorer – **16 years 37 days** by Jeremy Monga (v Preston North End, 16 August 2025)
- Oldest goalscorer – **40 years 233 days** by Kevin Phillips (v Blackpool, 15 March 2014)
- Quickest goal – **9 seconds** by Matty Fryatt (v Preston North End, 15 April 2006)
- Quickest hat-trick – **5 minutes** by Fred Shinton (v Oldham Athletic, 29 November 1909)

== Internationals ==
As of 25 February 2024

- Most international caps won while at Leicester – **84** by Kasper Schmeichel for Denmark
- Most England international caps won while at Leicester – **37** by Gordon Banks
- Most Scotland international caps won while at Leicester – **18** by Matt Elliott
- Most Wales international caps won while at Leicester – **50** by Andy King
- Most Northern Ireland international caps won while at Leicester – **39** by John O'Neill
- Most international caps won while at Leicester for a non-British nation – **84** by Kasper Schmeichel for Denmark
- Most international goals scored while at Leicester – **13** by Patson Daka for Zambia
- Most England international goals scored while at Leicester – **7** by Jamie Vardy

=== International honours ===
As of 18 November 2026

The following players have been selected by their country while playing for Leicester City (including players both on loan at, and away from the club). The number of caps won whilst at the club are given, along with the date of the first cap being won while with Leicester City. Players listed in bold are current Leicester City players.

- (Wales) Alfred Watkins (2 Caps, 19 March 1898)
- (Wales) Richard Jones (1 Cap, 19 March 1898)
- (Northern Ireland) Mick Cochrane (1 Cap, 23 February 1901)
- (England) Horace Bailey (5 Caps, 16 March 1908)
- (Scotland) Andy Aitken (3 Caps, 2 April 1910)
- (England) Douglas McWhirter (4 Caps, 21 March 1913)
- (England) Ronald Brebner (3 Caps, 15 November 1913)
- (Scotland) John Paterson (1 Cap, 10 April 1920)
- (Northern Ireland) Mick O'Brien (3 Caps, 4 March 1922)
- (Scotland) John Duncan (1 Cap, 31 October 1925)
- (England) Sid Bishop (4 Caps, 2 April 1927)
- (England) Reg Osborne (1 Cap, 28 November 1927)
- (England) Leonard Barry (5 Caps, 17 May 1928)
- (England) Ernest Hine (6 Caps, 22 October 1928)
- (England) Hugh Adcock (5 Caps, 9 May 1929)
- (Wales) David Jones (7 Caps, 4 November 1933)
- (Wales) Thomas Mills (1 Cap, 29 September 1934)
- (England) Septimus Smith (1 Cap, 19 October 1935)
- (Wales) William Maldwyn Griffiths (11 Caps, 16 April 1947)
- (Republic of Ireland) Tommy Godwin (5 Caps, 9 October 1949)
- (Wales) Arthur Lever (1 Cap, 18 October 1952)
- (Scotland) John Anderson (1 Cap, 25 May 1954)
- (Northern Ireland) Willie Cunningham (24 Caps, 3 November 1954)
- (Wales) Kenneth Leek (16 Caps, 20 October 1960)
- (England) Gordon Banks (35 Caps, 6 April 1963)
- (Scotland) David Gibson (7 Caps, 4 May 1963)
- (Scotland) Frank McLintock (3 Caps, 4 May 1963)
- (Northern Ireland) Derek Dougan (8 Caps, 2 October 1965)
- (Wales) Peter Rodrigues (16 Caps, 30 March 1966)
- (Scotland) Jackie Sinclair (1 Cap, 18 June 1966)
- (England) Peter Shilton (20 Caps, 25 November 1970)
- (England) Keith Weller (4 Caps, 11 May 1974)
- (England) Frank Worthington (8 Caps, 15 May 1974)
- (England) Steve Whitworth (7 Caps, 12 March 1975)
- (Republic of Ireland) Joe Waters (1 Cap, 13 October 1976)
- (Northern Ireland) John O'Neill (39 Caps, 26 March 1980)
- (Republic of Ireland) Gerry Daly (1 Cap, 22 September 1982)
- (Northern Ireland) Paul Ramsey (14 Caps, 21 September 1983)
- (England) Gary Lineker (7 Caps, 26 May 1984)
- (Scotland) Ian Wilson (2 Caps, 23 May 1987)
- (Finland) Jari Rantanen (10 Caps, 9 September 1987)
- (Wales) Robbie James (2 Caps, 9 September 1987)
- (Northern Ireland) James Quinn (4 Caps, 14 September 1988)
- (Republic of Ireland) David Kelly (7 Caps, 25 April 1990)
- (Scotland) Gary McAllister (3 Caps, 25 April 1990)
- (Republic of Ireland) Brian Carey (1 Cap, 23 March 1994)
- (Wales) Iwan Roberts (3 Caps, 20 April 1994)
- (Northern Ireland) Colin Hill (16 Caps, 29 March 1995)
- (Australia) Zeljko Kalac (2 Caps, 25 February 1996)
- (Northern Ireland) Neil Lennon (29 Caps, 27 March 1996)
- (United States) Kasey Keller (21 Caps, 3 November 1996)
- (Sweden) Pontus Kåmark (17 Caps, 30 April 1997)
- (Wales) Robbie Savage (20 Caps, 20 August 1997)
- (Scotland) Matt Elliott (18 Caps, 12 November 1997)
- (Greece) Theodoros Zagorakis (18 Caps, 17 February 1998)
- (Iceland) Arnar Gunnlaugsson (3 Caps, 10 March 1999)
- (England) Emile Heskey (5 Caps, 28 April 1999)
- (Jamaica) Frank Sinclair (17 Caps, 26 May 1999)
- (England) Steve Guppy (1 Cap, 10 October 1999)
- (Northern Ireland) Gerry Taggart (6 Caps, 26 April 2000)
- (Turkey) Mustafa Izzet (8 Caps, 15 June 2000)
- (Scotland) Callum Davidson (5 Caps, 2 September 2000)
- (Wales) Matt Jones (8 Caps, 24 March 2001)
- (Jamaica) Trevor Benjamin (2 Caps (1 won while on loan to Gillingham), 20 November 2002)
- (Northern Ireland) Keith Gillespie (9 Caps, 6 September 2003)
- (Scotland) Paul Dickov (5 Caps, 6 September 2003)
- (Greece) Nikos Dabizas (6 Caps, 18 February 2004)
- (Wales) Benjamin Thatcher (3 Caps, 31 March 2001)
- (Wales) Danny Coyne (3 Caps, 31 March 2001)
- (Scotland) Peter Canero (1 Cap, 28 April 2004)
- (England) Ian Walker (1 Cap, 5 June 2004)
- (Iceland) Joey Guðjónsson (6 Caps, 18 August 2004)
- (Canada) Lars Hirschfeld (1 Cap, 26 March 2005)
- (Republic of Ireland) Alan Maybury (1 Cap, 29 March 2005)
- (Australia) Danny Tiatto (1 Cap, 9 May 2005)
- (Scotland) Robert Douglas (1 Cap, 17 August 2005)
- (Canada) Iain Hume (7 Caps, 16 November 2005)
- (Guinea) Mohammed Sylla (3 Caps, 7 January 2006)
- (Ghana) Elvis Hammond (1 Cap, 1 March 2006)
- (Australia) Patrick Kisnorbo (3 Caps, 14 November 2006)
- (Iran) Hossein Kaebi (2 Caps, 15 July 2007)
- (Hungary) Márton Fülöp (7 Caps (won while on loan from Sunderland), 22 August 2007)
- (Bulgaria) Radostin Kishishev (4 Caps (2 won while on loan at Leeds United), 22 August 2007)
- (Northern Ireland) Gareth McAuley (4 Caps, 17 October 2007)
- (Bulgaria) Aleksander Tunchev (5 Caps, 6 September 2008)
- (Wales) Andy King (50 Caps (3 won while on loan at Swansea City), 29 May 2009)
- (Northern Ireland) Ryan McGivern (3 Caps (won while on loan from Manchester City), 14 October 2009)
- (Japan) Yuki Abe (4 Caps, 8 October 2010)
- (Republic of Ireland) Greg Cunningham (1 Cap (won while on loan from Manchester City), 17 November 2010)
- (Netherlands) Jeffrey Bruma (1 Cap (won while on loan from Chelsea), 7 June 2011)
- (Republic of Ireland) Sean St Ledger (19 Caps (3 won while on loan at Millwall), 10 August 2011)
- (Switzerland) Gelson Fernandes (4 Caps (won while on loan from Saint-Étienne), 6 September 2011)
- (Ghana) John Paintsil (8 Caps, 5 November 2011)
- (Ivory Coast) Souleymane Bamba (8 Caps, 12 November 2011)
- (Ghana) Jeffrey Schlupp (15 Caps, 15 November 2011)
- (Denmark) Kasper Schmeichel (84 Caps, 6 February 2013)
- (New Zealand) Chris Wood (9 Caps (1 won while on loan at Ipswich Town), 22 March 2013)
- (Jamaica) Jermaine Beckford (5 Caps (won while on loan at Huddersfield Town), 22 March 2013)
- (Jamaica) Wes Morgan (30 Caps, 7 September 2013)
- (Lithuania) Simonas Stankevičius (10 Caps, 18 November 2013)
- (Hungary) Márkó Futács (3 Caps (won while on loan at Diósgyőr), 5 March 2014)
- (Algeria) Riyad Mahrez (39 Caps, 31 May 2014)
- (Saint Kitts and Nevis) Harrison Panayiotou (12 Caps (5 won while on loan at Raith Rovers), 8 October 2014)
- (Sierra Leone) Alie Sesay (3 Caps, 11 October 2014)
- (Croatia) Andrej Kramarić (10 Caps (5 won while on loan at 1899 Hoffenheim), 28 March 2015)
- (England) Jamie Vardy (26 Caps, 7 June 2015)
- (Japan) Shinji Okazaki (26 Caps, 3 September 2015)
- (Austria) Christian Fuchs (11 Caps, 5 September 2015)
- (Switzerland) Gökhan Inler (5 Caps, 8 September 2015)
- (Wales) Tom Lawrence (6 Caps (2 won while on loan at Blackburn Rovers, 2 at Cardiff City and 2 at Ipswich Town), 13 October 2015)
- (Ghana) Daniel Amartey (43 Caps, 24 March 2016)
- (France) N'Golo Kanté (8 Caps, 25 March 2016)
- (England) Danny Drinkwater (3 Caps, 29 March 2016)
- (Nigeria) Ahmed Musa (17 Caps (8 won while on loan at CSKA Moscow), 3 September 2016)
- (Poland) Bartosz Kapustka (3 Caps, 4 September 2016)
- (Algeria) Islam Slimani (26 Caps (3 won while on loan at Newcastle United, 2 at Fenerbahçe and 5 at Monaco), 4 September 2016)
- (Brunei) Faiq Jefri Bolkiah (6 Caps, 15 October 2016)
- (Nigeria) Wilfred Ndidi (59 Caps, 23 March 2017)
- (Nigeria) Kelechi Iheanacho (44 Caps, 1 September 2017)
- (Austria) Aleksandar Dragović (8 Caps (won while on loan from Bayer Leverkusen), 2 September 2017)
- (England) Harry Maguire (20 Caps, 8 October 2017)
- (Zimbabwe) Admiral Muskwe (4 Caps, 8 November 2017)
- (Tunisia) Yohan Benalouane (5 Caps, 23 March 2018)
- (Portugal) Adrien Silva (6 Caps, 26 March 2018)
- (Wales) George Thomas (3 Caps (2 won while on loan at Scunthorpe United), 29 May 2018)
- (Portugal) Ricardo Pereira (3 Caps, 30 June 2018)
- (Turkey) Çağlar Söyüncü (37 Caps, 7 September 2018)
- (Northern Ireland) Jonny Evans (32 Caps, 8 September 2018)
- (Algeria) Rachid Ghezzal (6 Caps (3 won while on loan at Beşiktaş), 8 September 2018)
- (England) Ben Chilwell (11 Caps, 11 September 2018)
- (Wales) Danny Ward (40 Caps, 20 November 2018)
- (Belgium) Youri Tielemans (41 Caps (4 won while on loan from Monaco), 21 March 2019)
- (Croatia) Filip Benković (1 Cap (won while on loan at Celtic), 11 June 2019)
- (Belgium) Dennis Praet (12 Caps (2 won while on loan at Torino), 6 September 2019)
- (England) James Maddison (3 Caps, 14 November 2019)
- (Belgium) Timothy Castagne (26 Caps, 5 September 2020)
- (Turkey) Cengiz Ünder (11 Caps (won while on loan from Roma), 7 October 2020)
- (England) Harvey Barnes (1 Cap, 8 October 2020)
- (Senegal) Nampalys Mendy (27 Caps, 26 March 2021)
- (Thailand) Thanawat Suengchitthawon (9 Caps, 29 May 2021)
- (Zambia) Patson Daka (31 Caps, 3 September 2021)
- (Denmark) Jannik Vestergaard (31 Caps, 9 October 2021)
- (Nigeria) Ademola Lookman (4 Caps (won while on loan from RB Leipzig), 25 March 2022)
- (England) James Justin (1 Cap, 4 June 2022)
- (Australia) **Harry Souttar** (32 Caps (6 won while on loan at Sheffield United), 24 March 2023)
- (Belgium) Wout Faes (27 Caps, 24 March 2023)
- (Guyana) Bayli Spencer-Adams (2 Caps, 25 March 2023)
- (Bermuda) Deniche Hill (5 Caps, 25 March 2023)
- (Jamaica) Brandon Cover (1 Cap, 19 June 2023)
- (Denmark) **Victor Kristiansen** (18 Caps (11 won while on loan at Bologna), 19 June 2023)
- (Turkey) Yunus Akgün (5 Caps (won while on loan from Galatasaray), 12 October 2023)
- (Ghana) Abdul Fatawu Issahaku (18 Caps (5 won while on loan from Sporting CP), 21 November 2023)
- (Zimbabwe) Tawanda Maswanhise (3 Caps, 26 March 2024)
- (Republic of Ireland) Thomas Cannon (2 Caps (1 won while on loan at Stoke City), 11 June 2024)
- (Ghana) Jordan Ayew (18 Caps, 5 September 2024)
- (Morocco) Bilal El Khannouss (26 Caps (18 won while on loan at VfB Stuttgart), 6 September 2024)
- (Jamaica) **Bobby De Cordova-Reid** (12 Caps, 7 September 2024)
- (Republic of Ireland) Kasey McAteer (6 Caps, 7 September 2024)
- (Bangladesh) Hamza Choudhury (10 Caps (3 won while on loan at Sheffield United), 25 March 2025)
- (Mali) **Woyo Coulibaly** (7 Caps (6 won while on loan at US Sassuolo), 5 June 2025)
- (Wales) Jordan James (6 Caps (won while on loan from Stade Rennais), 4 September 2025)
- (Wales) **Wesley Burns** (2 Caps, 27 September 2026)
- (Wales) **Liam Cullen** (3 Caps, 1 October 2026)
- (Democratic Republic of the Congo) **Stephy Mavididi** (2 Caps (won while on loan at Watford), 2 October 2026)

=== World Cup players ===
The following players have been selected by their country in the World Cup Finals, while playing for Leicester. Players listed in bold are current Leicester City players.

- (Scotland) John Anderson (1954)
- (Northern Ireland) Willie Cunningham (1958)
- (Wales) Ken Leek (1958)
- (England) Gordon Banks (1966) – Won the 1966 World Cup while at Leicester
- (Northern Ireland) John O'Neill (1982, 1986)
- (Northern Ireland) Paul Ramsey (1986)
- (Scotland) Gary McAllister (1990)
- (Republic of Ireland) David Kelly (1990)
- (Scotland) Matt Elliott (1998)
- (United States) Kasey Keller (1998)
- (Turkey) Muzzy Izzet (2002)
- (Algeria) Riyad Mahrez (2014)
- (Denmark) Kasper Schmeichel (2018)
- (England) Harry Maguire (2018)
- (England) Jamie Vardy (2018)
- (Japan) Shinji Okazaki (2018)
- (Nigeria) Wilfred Ndidi (2018)
- (Nigeria) Kelechi Iheanacho (2018)
- (Nigeria) Ahmed Musa (2018)
- (Portugal) Adrien Silva (2018)
- (Portugal) Ricardo Pereira (2018)
- (Tunisia) Yohan Benalouane (2018)
- (Senegal) Nampalys Mendy (2022)
- (England) James Maddison (2022)
- (Wales) Danny Ward (2022)
- (Belgium) Wout Faes (2022)
- (Belgium) Timothy Castagne (2022)
- (Belgium) Youri Tielemans (2022)
- (Ghana) Daniel Amartey (2022)
- (Morocco) Bilal El Khannouss (2026)
- (Australia) **Harry Souttar** (2026)
- (Ghana) Jordan Ayew (2026)
- (Ghana) Abdul Fatawu (2026)

=== Continental competition players ===
The following players have been selected by their country in various continental tournaments, while playing for Leicester. Players listed in bold are current Leicester City players.

- (United States) Kasey Keller (1998 CONCACAF Gold Cup)
- (Jamaica) Frank Sinclair (2000 CONCACAF Gold Cup)
- (Turkey) Muzzy Izzet (UEFA Euro 2000)
- (England) Ian Walker (UEFA Euro 2004)
- (Greece) Nikos Dabizas (UEFA Euro 2004)
- (Guinea) Mohammed Sylla (2006 Africa Cup of Nations)
- (Canada) Iain Hume (2007 CONCACAF Gold Cup)
- (Australia) Patrick Kisnorbo (2007 AFC Asian Cup)
- (Iran) Hossein Kaebi (2007 AFC Asian Cup)
- (Ghana) John Paintsil (2012 Africa Cup of Nations)
- (Republic of Ireland) Sean St Ledger (UEFA Euro 2012)
- (Denmark) Kasper Schmeichel (UEFA Euro 2012, UEFA Euro 2020)
- (Algeria) Riyad Mahrez (2015 Africa Cup of Nations, 2017 Africa Cup of Nations)
- (Jamaica) Wes Morgan (2015 CONCACAF Gold Cup)
- (Wales) Andy King (UEFA Euro 2016)
- (Austria) Christian Fuchs (UEFA Euro 2016)
- (England) Jamie Vardy (UEFA Euro 2016)
- (France) N'Golo Kanté (UEFA Euro 2016)
- (Ghana) Daniel Amartey (2017 Africa Cup of Nations, 2021 Africa Cup of Nations)
- (Algeria) Islam Slimani (2017 Africa Cup of Nations, 2019 Africa Cup of Nations) (Note: While on loan at Fenerbahçe S.K.)
- (Nigeria) Wilfred Ndidi (2019 Africa Cup of Nations, 2021 Africa Cup of Nations)
- (Turkey) Çağlar Söyüncü (UEFA Euro 2020)
- (Turkey) Cengiz Ünder (UEFA Euro 2020) (Note: While on loan from AS Roma)
- (Wales) Danny Ward (UEFA Euro 2020)
- (Belgium) Dennis Praet (UEFA Euro 2020)
- (Belgium) Timothy Castagne (UEFA Euro 2020)
- (Belgium) Youri Tielemans (UEFA Euro 2020)
- (Nigeria) Kelechi Iheanacho (2021 Africa Cup of Nations, 2023 Africa Cup of Nations)
- (Senegal) Nampalys Mendy (2021 Africa Cup of Nations)
- (Australia) **Harry Souttar** (2023 AFC Asian Cup)
- (Zambia) Patson Daka (2023 Africa Cup of Nations, 2025 Africa Cup of Nations)
- (Denmark) Jannik Vestergaard (UEFA Euro 2024)
- (Denmark) **Victor Kristiansen** (UEFA Euro 2024)
- (Belgium) Wout Faes (UEFA Euro 2024)
- (Turkey) Yunus Akgün (UEFA Euro 2024) (Note: While on loan from Galatasaray S.K.)
- (Jamaica) **Bobby De Cordova-Reid** (2025 CONCACAF Gold Cup)
- (Morocco) Bilal El Khannouss (2025 Africa Cup of Nations) (Note: While on loan at VfB Stuttgart)
- (Mali) **Woyo Coulibaly** (2025 Africa Cup of Nations) (Note: While on loan at US Sassuolo)

== Scorelines ==
=== Wins ===
- Biggest win – 13–0 (v Notts Olympic – FA Cup, 13 October 1894)
- Biggest league win – 10–0 (v Portsmouth, 20 October 1928)
- Biggest win in the first tier (Premier League and predecessors) – 10–0 (v Portsmouth, 20 October 1928)
- Biggest Premier League win – 9–0 (v Southampton, 25 October 2019)
- Biggest win in the second tier (Championship and predecessors) – 9–1 (v Walsall Town Swifts, 5 January 1895) and (v Gainsborough Trinity, 27 December 1909)
- Biggest win in the third tier (League One and predecessors) – 4–0 (on three occasions)
- Biggest FA Cup win – 13–0 (v Notts Olympic, 13 October 1894)
- Biggest League Cup win – 8–1 (v Coventry City, 1 December 1964)

=== Draws ===
- Highest scoring draw – 6–6 (v Arsenal, 21 April 1930)
- Highest scoring draw in the first tier (Premier League and predecessors) – 6–6 (v Arsenal, 21 April 1930)
- Highest scoring draw in the second tier (Championship and predecessors) – 5–5 (v Sheffield United, 3 November 1951)
- Highest scoring draw in the third tier (League One and predecessors) – 2–2 (on six occasions)
- Highest scoring FA Cup draw – 5–5 (v Tottenham Hotspur, 10 January 1914) and (v Luton Town, 12 February 1949)
- Highest scoring League Cup draw – 4–4 (v Charlton Athletic, 26 September 1962)

=== Defeats ===
- Biggest defeat – 7–15 (v Liverpool, 21 April 1906)
- Biggest league defeat – 0–12 (v Nottingham Forest, 21 April 1909)
- Biggest defeat in the first tier (Premier League and predecessors) – 0–12 (v Nottingham Forest, 21 April 1909)
- Biggest defeat in the second tier (Championship and predecessors) – 4-13 (v Woolwich Arsenal, 26 October 1903)
- Biggest defeat in the third tier (League One and predecessors) – 0-2 (v Tranmere Rovers, 11 March 2009) and (v Peterborough United, 28 March 2009)
- Biggest FA Cup defeat – 0–5 (v Manchester City, 17 January 1996)
- Biggest League Cup defeat – 1–7 (v Sheffield Wednesday, 27 October 1992) and 0–6 (v Leeds United, 9 October 2001)

== Sequences ==
=== Consecutive wins ===
- Most consecutive league wins – 9 (21 December 2013 – 1 February 2014)
- Most consecutive league home wins – 13 (3 September 1906 – 29 December 1906)
- Most consecutive league away wins – 7 (12 August 2023 – 28 October 2023)
- Most consecutive wins in all competitions – 10 (26 December 1962 – 16 March 1963)
- Most consecutive FA Cup wins – 7 (9 January 2021 – 8 January 2022)
- Most consecutive League Cup wins – 6 (16 September 1998 – 17 February 1999)

=== Consecutive draws ===
- Most consecutive league draws – 6 (on three occasions)
- Most consecutive league home draws – 5 (on two occasions)
- Most consecutive league away draws – 5 (on two occasions)
- Most consecutive league 0–0 draws – 3 (on four occasions)

=== Consecutive defeats ===
- Most consecutive league defeats – 8 (twice) (17 March 2001 – 28 April 2001) & (1 February 2025 – 7 April 2025)
- Most consecutive league home defeats – 9 (22 December 2024 – 20 April 2025)
- Most consecutive league away defeats – 15 (18 October 1986 – 2 May 1987)
- Most consecutive defeats in all competitions – 9 (twice) (10 March 2001 – 28 April 2001) & (1 February 2025 – 7 April 2025)
- Most consecutive FA Cup defeats – 7 (19 February 1985 – 5 January 1991)
- Most consecutive League Cup defeats – 9 (11 November 1975 – 6 October 1981)

=== Consecutive games without defeat ===
- Most consecutive league games without defeat – 23 (1 November 2008 – 7 March 2009)
- Most consecutive league home games without defeat – 40 (12 February 1898 – 17 April 1900)
- Most consecutive league away games without defeat – 13 (21 December 2013 – 23 August 2014)
- Most consecutive games without defeat in all competitions – 17 (6 December 1924 – 28 February 1925)
- Most consecutive FA Cup games without defeat – 9 (7 January 1961 – 27 March 1961)
- Most consecutive League Cup games without defeat – 17 (25 September 1963 – 10 February 1965)

=== Consecutive games without a win ===
- Most consecutive league games without a win – 18 (12 April 1975 – 1 November 1975)
- Most consecutive league home games without a win – 12 (22 November 2003 – 24 April 2004)
- Most consecutive league away games without a win – 23 (19 November 1988 – 4 November 1989)
- Most consecutive games without winning in all competitions – 18 (12 April 1975 – 13 September 1976)
- Most consecutive FA Cup games without winning – 7 (19 February 1985 – January 1991)
- Most consecutive League Cup games without winning – 9 (11 November 1975 – 6 October 1981)

=== Consecutive scoring and conceding runs ===
- Most consecutive league games scored in – 32 (23 November 2013 – 16 August 2014)
- Most consecutive league games without scoring – 8 (1 February 2025 – 7 April 2025)
- Most consecutive league home games without scoring – 9 (22 December 2024 – 20 April 2025)
- Most consecutive league games without conceding – 7 (14 February 1920 – 27 March 1920)
- Most consecutive league games without a clean sheet – 37 (9 February 1957 – 26 December 1957)

== Individual League Seasons ==
=== Wins ===
- Most league wins in a season – 31 (from 46 games, Championship, 2013–14)
- Most home league wins in a season – 17 (from 23 games, Championship, 2013–14)
- Most away league wins in a season – 14 (from 23 games, League One, 2008–09) and (from 23 games, Championship, 2013–14)
- Fewest league wins in a season – 5 (from 42 games, First Division (old), 1977–78) and (from 38 games, Premier League, 2001–02)
- Fewest home league wins in a season – 3 (from 19 games, Premier League, 2001–02) and (from 19 games, Premier League, 2003–04)
- Fewest away league wins in a season – 1 (on 3 occasions)

=== Draws ===
- Most league draws in a season – 21 (from 46 games, Championship, 2004–05)
- Most home league draws in a season – 10 (on 3 occasions)
- Most away league draws in a season – 13 (from 23 games, Championship, 2004–05)
- Fewest league draws in a season – 4 (on 5 occasions)
- Fewest home league draws in a season – 0 (from 15 games, Second Division (old), 1895–96)
- Fewest away league draws in a season – 0 (from 19 games, Second Division (old), 1914–15)

=== Defeats ===
- Most league defeats in a season – 25 (from 42 games, First Division (old), 1977–78) and (from 42 games, Premier League 1994–95)
- Most home league defeats in a season – 10 (from 21 games, First Division (old), 1977–78), (from 21 games, Premier League, 1994–95) and (from 19 games, Premier League, 2022-23)
- Most away league defeats in a season – 17 (from 21 games, First Division (old), 1957–58) and (from 21 games, First Division (old), 1986–87)
- Fewest league defeats in a season – 3 (from 38 games, Premier League, 2015–16)
- Fewest home league defeats in a season – 0 (from 21 games, First Division (old), 1928–29) and (from 17 games, Second Division (old), 1898–99)
- Fewest away league defeats in a season – 2 (from 19 games, Premier League, 2015–16)

=== Goals Scored ===
- Most league goals scored in a season – 109 (from 42 games, Second Division (old), 1956–57)
- Most home league goals scored in a season – 68 (in 21 games, Second Division (old), 1956–57)
- Most away league goals scored in a season – 43 (from 23 games, League One, 2008–09)
- Fewest league goals scored in a season – 26 (from 42 games, First Division (old), 1977–78)
- Fewest home league goals scored in a season – 15 (from 19 games, Premier League, 2001–02)
- Fewest away league goals scored in a season – 9 (from 21 games, Second Division (old), 1921–22)

=== Goals Conceded ===
- Most league goals conceded in a season – 112 (from 42 games, First Division (old), 1957–58)
- Most home league goals conceded in a season – 41 (in 21 games, First Division (old), 1957–58)
- Most away league goals conceded in a season – 71 (in 21 games, First Division (old), 1957–58)
- Fewest league goals conceded in a season – 30 (from 42 games, Second Division (old), 1970–71)
- Fewest home league goals conceded in a season – 8 (from 17 games, Second Division (old), 1899–1900)
- Fewest away league goals conceded in a season – 16 (from 21 games, Second Division (old), 1970–71)

=== Goal Difference ===
- Best league goal difference in a season – +58 (from 42 games, Second Division (old), 1924–25)
- Worst league goal difference in a season – -48 (from 38 games, First Division (old), 1908–09)

=== Points ===
- Most league points in a season (2 points for a win) – 61 (from 42 games, Second Division (old), 1956–57)
- Most league points in a season (3 points for a win) – 102 (from 46 games, Championship, 2013–14)
- Fewest league points in a season (2 points for a win) – 22 (from 34 games, Second Division (old), 1903–04) and (from 42 games, First Division (old), 1977–78)
- Fewest league points in a season (3 points for a win) – 25 (from 38 games), Premier League, 2024-25)

== Opponents and Familiarity ==
All stats correct up to 19 October 2019

- Club played most often – 141 times v Arsenal (including as Woolwich Arsenal)
- Club played most often in the league – 128 times v West Ham United
- Club played most often in the FA Cup – 15 times v Manchester City
- Club played most often in a single season 7 times v Arsenal (2xFL, 3xFAC, 2xFLC)(1974–75)
- Non-home ground Leicester have played on most often – 65 times on the Boleyn Ground (a.k.a. Upton Park)(including twice v Charlton Athletic)
- Player who has scored the most goals scored against Leicester – 18 by Dixie Dean (18 with Everton) and George Brown (9 with Huddersfield Town and 9 with Aston Villa)

== Home attendances ==
- Highest home attendance – 47,298 v Tottenham Hotspur (at Filbert Street, (FA Cup 5th round, 18 February 1928)
- Highest home league attendance – 42,486 v Arsenal (at Filbert Street, First Division (old), 2 October 1954)
- Highest home attendance in the second tier (Championship and predecessors) – 40,830 v Nottingham Forest (at Filbert Street, 17 November 1956)
- Highest home attendance in the third tier (League One and predecessors) – 30,542 v Scunthorpe United (at Walkers Stadium, 24 April 2009)
- Highest home FA Cup attendance – 47,298 v Tottenham Hotspur (at Filbert Street, 5th round, 8 February 1928)
- Highest home League Cup attendance – 35,121 v West Bromwich Albion (at Filbert Street, 5th round, 29 October 1969)
- Highest average attendance for a league season – 32,014 (Premier League, 2015–16)
- Highest attendance at Walkers/King Power Stadium – 32,242 v Sunderland (Premier League, 8 August 2015)

== Individual honours and awards ==
Ballon d'Or nominees The following players have been nominated for the Ballon d'Or while playing for Leicester, the award is also referred to as the World or European footballer of the year.

- (England) Gordon Banks (1966)
- (England) Jamie Vardy (2016)
- (Algeria) Riyad Mahrez (2016)

PFA Player of the Year The following players have been named the PFA Player of the Year while playing for Leicester:

- 2016 – (Algeria) Riyad Mahrez

FWA Footballer of the Year The following players have been named the FWA Footballer of the Year while playing for Leicester:

- 2016 – (England) Jamie Vardy

English Golden Boot The following players have won the English Golden Boot for being the country's top goalscorer, while at Leicester (note: This applies only to players playing in the top tier of English football):

- (England) Gary Lineker (1984–85) (joint winner)
- (England) Jamie Vardy (2019–20)

English Second Division Golden Boot The following players have won the golden boot for being the top goalscorer in the second tier of English football while at Leicester:

- (England) David Skea (1894–95)
- (England) Arthur Chandler (1924–25)
- (England) Jack Bowers (1936–37)
- (England) Arthur Rowley (1952–53), (1956–57)
- (Scotland) Willie Gardiner (1955–56)
- (England) Gary Lineker (1982–83)

Football League Awards Player of the Year The following players have been named the best player in their division in the Football League Awards while at Leicester:

- (England) Matty Fryatt (League One, 2009)

LMA Manager of the Year The following managers have been named the LMA Manager of the Year or won their division award while at Leicester:

- (England) Nigel Pearson (Championship, 2014)
- (Italy) Claudio Ranieri (Overall, 2016; Premier League, 2016)

The Best FIFA Men's Player nominees The following players have been shortlisted for The Best FIFA Men's Player award, while playing for Leicester:

- (England) Jamie Vardy (2016)
- (Algeria) Riyad Mahrez (2016)

The Best FIFA Men's Coach The following managers have been shortlisted and won, The Best FIFA Men's Coach award while managing Leicester:

- (Italy) Claudio Ranieri (2016)

The Best FIFA Goalkeeper nominees The following goalkeepers have been shortlisted for The Best FIFA Goalkeeper award, while playing for Leicester:

- (Denmark) Kasper Schmeichel (2018, 2021)

BBC Sports Personality Coach of the Year Award

- (Italy) Claudio Ranieri (2016)

BBC Sports Personality Team of the Year Award

- (England) Leicester City (2016)

ESPN Team of the Year

- (England) Leicester City (2016)

Laureus World Sports Award

- (England) Leicester City (2017)

FIFA FIFPro World11 nominees The following players have been shortlisted for the FIFA FIFPro World11, while playing for Leicester:

- (England) Jamie Vardy (2016)

PFA Team of the Year The following players have been named in the PFA Team of the Year while at Leicester:

- 1978–79 – Second Division – (England) Mark Wallington
- 1981–82 – Second Division – (England) Mark Wallington
- 1988–89 – Second Division – (Scotland) Gary McAllister
- 1989–90 – Second Division – (Scotland) Gary McAllister
- 1995–96 – First Division – (England) Garry Parker, (England) Steve Claridge
- 2002–03 – First Division – (Turkey) Muzzy Izzet, (Scotland) Paul Dickov
- 2008–09 – League One – (England) Jack Hobbs, (England) Matt Oakley, (England) Matty Fryatt
- 2010–11 – Championship – (England) Kyle Naughton, (Wales) Andy King
- 2012–13 – Championship – (Denmark) Kasper Schmeichel, (Jamaica) Wes Morgan
- 2013–14 – Championship – (Denmark) Kasper Schmeichel, (Jamaica) Wes Morgan, (England) Danny Drinkwater
- 2015–16 – Premier League – (Jamaica) Wes Morgan, (France) N'Golo Kanté, (Algeria) Riyad Mahrez, (England) Jamie Vardy
- 2019–20 – Premier League – (Turkey) Çağlar Söyüncü, (England) Jamie Vardy
