= Leicester City 6–6 Arsenal (1930) =

- Event: 1929–30 First Division
Leicester City	Arsenal
6	6
- Date: 21 April 1930
- Venue: Filbert Street, Leicester
- Attendance: 27,241

The 1929–30 season First Division match between Leicester City and Arsenal at Filbert Street took place on 21 April 1930. The game finished as a 6–6 draw, the highest scoring draw in the history of first class English football. The record still stands today, though was matched in a Second Division fixture between Charlton Athletic and Middlesbrough in October 1960.

== Details ==
21 April 1930

Leicester City	6–6	Arsenal
Adcock (2); Lochhead (2); Hine; Barry		Halliday (4); Bastin (2)

Filbert Street, Leicester
Attendance: 27,241

Leicester City	Arsenal

GK	1	(England) Joe Wright
RB	2	(Scotland) Adam Black
LB	3	(England) Jack Brown
RH	4	(Scotland) Johnny Duncan
CH	5	(England) Arthur Woolliscroft
LH	6	(England) Norman Watson
OR	7	(England) Hugh Adcock
IR	8	(England) Ernie Hine
CF	9	(England) Arthur Chandler
IL	10	(Scotland) Arthur Lochhead
OL	11	(England) Len Barry
Manager:
(Scotland) Willie Orr

GK	1	(Wales) Dan Lewis
RB	2	(England) Tom Parker
LB	3	(England) Horace Cope
RH	4	(England) Alf Baker
CH	5	(England) Alf Haynes
LH	6	(Wales) Bob John
OR	7	(England) Joe Hulme
IR	8	(England) David Jack
FW	9	(Scotland) Dave Halliday
IL	10	(Scotland) Alex James
OL	11	(England) Cliff Bastin
Manager:
(England) Herbert Chapman

=== Summary ===
The game took place five days before Arsenal's FA Cup final against Huddersfield Town and the club rested a number of players. Arsenal's David Halliday scored four goals as Arsenal came back from a half-time scoreline of 3–1 to draw the game 6–6 The Gunners also had a goal disallowed.

== Aftermath ==
Arsenal played in the FA Cup final later in the same week. Despite his four goals Halliday was not selected for the game. Arsenal went on to lift the trophy, defeating Huddersfield Town 2–0. Halliday now had five goals from his last three Arsenal first team's games. However, after the Leicester 6–6 draw he never played for Arsenal's first team again.

Halliday later became Leicester's manager.
