= William Orr =

Bill, Billy, Willie or William Orr may refer to:

== In activism or public service ==
- William Orr (United Irishman) (1766–1797), member of United Irishmen who was executed
- William Orr (Australian politician) (1843–1929), Australian politician and mining prospector
- Sir William Orr-Ewing, 2nd Bt. (1848–1903), son of Sir Archibald Orr-Ewing, 1st Baronet
- William Edwin Orr (1881–1965), American federal judge
- William Orr (trade unionist) (1900–1954), Australian coal miner and trade unionist
- Bill Orr (Nebraska first gentleman) (1935–2013), American insurance executive and Nebraska's only First Gentleman
- William Alexander Orr (1836–1913), member of the Texas House of Representatives

== In sports ==
- Willie Orr (1873–1946), Scottish football player and manager
- Willie Orr (footballer, born 1875) (1875–1912), Scottish footballer
- Billy Orr (footballer) (1883–1963), Australian rules footballer
- Billy Orr (baseball) (1891–1967), Major League Baseball infielder
- Bill Orr, American racing driver in 1964 and 1965 Armstrong 500#Results
- Billy Orr (ice hockey) (born 1948), Canadian professional ice hockey defenceman
- Will Orr, New Zealand rally driver in 1992 World Rally Championship#Drivers' championship
- Bill Orr (football coach) (born 1983), Scottish football coach

== Other ==
- William Somerville Orr (before 1820–1873), English publisher and founder of William S Orr & Co.
- William McFadden Orr (1866–1934), British and Irish mathematician
- William Orr, American architect who built 1928 First Presbyterian Church (San Luis Obispo, California)
- William Orr, Scottish theatre director who immigrated to Australia and founded Phillip Street Theatre in 1953
- William T. Orr (1917–2002), American television producer
- William I. Orr (1919–2001), American amateur radio licensee and author

== See also ==
- William Orr House, a historic home in Center Township, LaPorte County, Indiana
- Billie Orr, American advocate for political and education reform since 1970
