= Norman Bullock =

English footballer and manager

Personal information
- Full name: Norman Bullock
- Date of birth: 8 September 1900
- Place of birth: Monton, England
- Date of death: 22 October 1970 (aged 70)
- Place of death: Leicester, England
- Height: 5 ft 8 1/2 in (1.74 m)
- Positions: Forward; defender

Youth career
- Salford Schools

Senior career*
| Years | Team | Apps | (Gls) |
- Broughton St John's
- Sedgley Park
| 1920–1935 | Bury | 506 | (125) |

International career
| 1923–1924 | England | 3 | (2) |

Managerial career
- 1935–1938: Bury
- 1938–1945: Chesterfield
- 1945–1949: Bury
- 1949–1955: Leicester City
- * Club domestic league appearances and goals

Norman Bullock (8 September 1900 – 22 October 1970) was an English professional footballer, who played as both a forward and a defender, and manager.

He began his career playing local amateur football before signing for Bury in 1920. In 15 years with the club, he set new club records for both appearances and goals, scoring 125 league goals in over 500 appearances. During his career he also represented England at international level, scoring twice.

After retiring from playing in 1935, he was appointed manager of Bury and remained in the role until 1938 when he left to manage Chesterfield. He returned to manage Bury for a second spell between 1945 and 1949 before leaving again to join Leicester City. He won promotion to the First Division with Leicester in 1954 but resigned the following season with the club in the relegation zone.

== Early life ==
Bullock was born in Monton, Eccles, Lancashire. He was one of six children born to Robert James Bullock, a draper, and his wife Sarah Jane.

== Playing career ==
Bullock played youth football for Salford Schools before playing amateur football for local sides Broughton St John's and Sedgley Park. In 1920, he joined Football League Second Division side Bury as an amateur, scoring twice on his debut. He turned professional with the side in February 1921 and soon established himself in the first team as a forward. He went on to become club captain and later converted to playing as a central defender. He spent 15 years with Bury as a player, setting club records for both appearances and league goals with 125 in 506 appearances. His goalscoring record was surpassed by Craig Madden in the 1980s.

During his career, Bullock won three caps for England at international level. He made his debut on 19 March 1923 in a 6–1 victory over Belgium at Arsenal Stadium, scoring his side's final goal of the game. He was forced to wait three years before winning his second cap, playing in a 3–1 defeat to Wales in February 1926. He won his third and final cap later in October of the same year during a 3–3 draw with Ireland, scoring England's equaliser in the 80th minute.

== Managerial career ==
Bullock was appointed manager of Bury in 1935 and remained in the role until leaving to join Chesterfield in 1938. He managed the club for one season before the outbreak of World War II and remained in charge during the hostilities. During the war, he worked as an analytical chemist for Staveley Coal and Iron Company. He returned to Bury in 1945, becoming the first manager to be handed the responsibility of picking the team.

In December 1949, Bullock was appointed manager of Second Division side Leicester City, replacing Johnny Duncan. Upon his arrival, he outlined his "five-year plan" with the goal taking Leicester into the First Division. Bullock set about restructuring the playing squad, replacing several senior players who he deemed to hold too much power at the club, and implemented several new rules at the club. These included players being banned from riding on motorcycles. During the 1953–54 season, he led the club to the Second Division title and promotion to the First Division with an attacking philosophy centred around forwards Arthur Rowley and Derek Hines. His side set a new club record by scoring 97 goals during the league season to win the title on goal average, bettering second placed Everton by 0.3 of a goal.

However, his side struggled to adapt to the First Division and by the end of the year the team was placed in the relegation zone. With Bullock's position already under threat, the club's record signing Johnny Morris was given a 14-day ban by the board for a breach of discipline. The ban was designed to force Bullock into resigning, which ultimately succeeded. Despite his departure, Bullock was allowed to live rent free for three months in the house provided by the club and received £1000 compensation. Leicester remained manager-less for the remainder of the season with the board taking over responsibility for the team selection and were relegated to the Second Division.

=== Managerial statistics ===
| Team | Country | From | To | Record | | | | |
| Team | Country | From | To | G | W | D | L | Win % |
|---|---|---|---|---|---|---|---|---|
| Bury | (England) | June 1934 | June 1938 | 177 | 75 | 31 | 71 | 42.37 |
| Chesterfield | (England) | June 1938 | July 1945 | 44 | 20 | 10 | 14 | 45.45 |
| Bury | (England) | July 1945 | November 1949 | 147 | 46 | 37 | 64 | 31.29 |
| Leicester City | (England) | December 1949 | February 1955 | 231 | 91 | 64 | 76 | 39.39 |
| Total | | | | 599 | 232 | 142 | 225 | 38.73 |

== Later life ==
After his departure from Leicester, Bullock moved away from football and purchased a printing business provided by Leicester City chairman Len Shipman. He died in 1970.

== Honours ==
=== Manager ===
Leicester City

- Football League Second Division winners: 1953–54 season
