= Peter Hodge =

Scottish football manager (1871–1934)

Personal information
- Full name: Peter Hodge
- Date of birth: 28 June 1871
- Place of birth: Leith, Scotland
- Date of death: 18 August 1934 (aged 63)
- Place of death: Perth, Scotland

Managerial career
- Years: Team
- 1907–1912: Raith Rovers
- 1914–1915: Stoke
- 1916–1919: Raith Rovers
- 1919–1926: Leicester City
- 1926–1932: Manchester City
- 1932–1934: Leicester City

Peter Hodge (18 June 1871 – 18 August 1934) was a Scottish football manager who managed Raith Rovers, Stoke City, Manchester City and spent most of his career with Leicester City (over two spells). He gained promotion while in charge of all four clubs.

== Career ==
=== Early career and Raith Rovers ===
Hodge began his career playing for a local youth team in 1890 then soon became secretary of Dunfermline Athletic's junior side whom he took to the final of the Scottish junior cup in 1897. He then became a fully qualified referee and spent a ten-year stint refereeing matches in the Scottish league and also became honorary secretary of Dunfemline in 1906."

He was hired Raith Rovers' first manager in 1907 and led them to the Second Division title in his first season in charge. Raith were then elected to the First Division in 1910, he was ousted by an "ambitious director" in October 1912.

=== Stoke ===
In June 1914, Stoke hired him as a replacement for Alfred Barker. He guided the club to the Southern League Division Two title and successful re-admission to the Football League, but his chance of management in the higher leagues vanished with the outbreak of World War I and the suspension of competitive football. Hodge returned to Scotland where he combined a job as a military recruiting officer with managing Raith.

=== Leicester City ===
Leicester as a club had spent most of their pre-war history with a lowly reputation of lower league obscurity, getting small crowds and having had to, on a couple of occasions, apply for re-election. The club also often found itself financial troubles, having entered administration just before the war.

However, Hodge began to change the infra-structure of the club becoming the club's first full manager, as opposed to the secretary/managers before him, disbanding the "selection committee" at the club and taking over full control of player and staff recruitment, team selection and tactics. He built the club up over several seasons, instilling the traditional "Scottish passing style" into the club, finally winning the Second Division in 1924-25 (only the second ever time the club would be playing in the top flight). He brought in players, several from has native Scotland, such as Arthur Chandler, Johnny Duncan, Adam Black, Hugh Adcock, Arthur Lochhead and Ernie Hine, all of whom would go on to become key players in the club's history and by the end of his stint average attendances had almost trebled from their pre-war averages.

This eventually culminated finishing in its highest ever league finish as runners-up in the 1928-29 season, though now under the stewardship of Willie Orr, Hodge is generally regarded as the "primary architect of [Leicester] City's rise to First Division respectability." and that "though it was Orr who took the club to its greatest ever league finishes, [Hodge] built up many of the systems and much of the side which saw the club go so close to its grail".

=== Manchester City ===
He later became Manchester City manager, where he once again guided a side to the Second Division title in 1928 and took the club to 3rd in the First Division two years later in 1930. During his time at Manchester City he reputedly signed on Matt Busby as a trainee.

=== Return to Leicester and Death ===
He again joined Leicester in 1932, leading the club reach its first ever FA Cup semi-final in 1933-34. Though he left on 31 July 1934 after suffering an illness during preparations for the 1934-35 season and died 18 days later in his home town of Perth. He was held in such high esteem by both the club and the players at Leicester that six of his players past and present: Arthur Chandler, Adam Black, Hugh Adcock, Arthur Lochhead, Jim McLaren and Roger Heywood were pall-bearers at his funeral.

== Managerial statistics ==
Managerial record by team and tenure
Team	From	To	Record				
Team	From	To	P	W	D	L	Win %
Stoke	June 1914	April 1915	30	21	4	5	70.0
Leicester City	September 1919	May 1926	310	125	84	101	40.3
Manchester City	May 1926	March 1932	256	120	58	78	46.9
Leicester City	March 1932	August 1934	100	34	26	40	34.0
Total			696	300	172	224	43.1

== Honours ==
=== As a manager ===
Raith Rovers

- Scottish Football League Second Division: 1907–08

Stoke

- Southern League Division Two: 1914–15

Leicester City

- Football League Second Division: 1924–25

Manchester City

- Football League Second Division: 1927–28
