= List of footballers in England by number of league goals =

The following is a list of the 136 footballers who have scored at least 200 domestic league goals in English league football. This includes the appearances and goals of both present and former players in the Premier League and The Football League. Goals scored in play-off games (1987 to date), Test Matches (1893 to 1898) and the abandoned 1939–40 season are not included.

Due to the close connections between English and Scottish football, several players have played for clubs in England and in the Scottish Football League and its successors and amassed over 200 goals across the two systems, including David McLean (over 160 goals in both), Joe Baker (over 140 in both), Neil Martin (over 110 in both) and Kenny Dalglish (over 110 in both).

Players who came up just short of the 200 mark with 199 goals include Ted Phillips, Marcus Stewart, Grenville Morris and Andrew Wilson. Three additional players would have been included in this list had goals scored in the abandoned 1939–40 season been included - Jock Dodds, Peter Doherty and Stan Pearson.

Horace Barnes, Tony Brown and Bobby Charlton are the only midfielders to have scored over 200 goals in English football.

== List of players ==
Players still active in the English leagues and the clubs they play for are listed in bold.
★ English Football Hall of Fame Inductee.

As of 21 November 2026

Rank	Player	Goals	Apps	Ratio	Years (Note: Displays first and last seasons where appearances made. For example, 1972–1994 displayed where first appearance was in the 1972–73 season and last appearance was in the 1993–94 season.)	Clubs	Notes
1	(England) Arthur Rowley	434	619	0.70	1946–1965	West Bromwich Albion (4), Fulham (27), Leicester City (251), Shrewsbury Town (152)	
2	(England) Dixie Dean ★	379	438	0.87	1923–1939	Tranmere Rovers (27), Everton (349), Notts County (3)	
3	(England) Jimmy Greaves ★	357	516	0.69	1957–1971	Chelsea (124), Tottenham Hotspur (220), West Ham United (13)	
4	(England) Steve Bloomer ★	352	599	0.59	1892–1914	Derby County (293), Middlesbrough (59)	
5	(England) George Camsell	345	439	0.79	1924–1939	Durham City (20), Middlesbrough (325)	
6	(Republic of Ireland) John Aldridge	329	609	0.54	1979–1998	Newport County (69), Oxford United (72), Liverpool (50), Tranmere Rovers (138)	
7	(England) Joe Smith	315	519	0.61	1908–1929	Bolton Wanderers (254), Stockport County (61)	
8	(England) John Atyeo	314	597	0.53	1950–1966	Portsmouth (0), Bristol City (314)	
9	(England) Vic Watson	312	498	0.63	1920–1936	West Ham United (298), Southampton (14)	
10	(England) Harry Bedford	308	487	0.63	1919–1934	Nottingham Forest (8), Blackpool (112), Derby County (142), Newcastle United (17), Sunderland (2), Bradford Park Avenue (15), Chesterfield (12)	
11	(England) Harry Johnson	305	476	0.64	1919–1936	Sheffield United (201), Mansfield Town (104)	
12	(Scotland) Hughie Gallacher ★	296	431	0.69	1925–1939	Newcastle United (133), Chelsea (72), Derby County (38), Notts County (32), Grimsby Town (3), Gateshead (18)	
13	(England) Gordon Hodgson	295	468	0.63	1925–1938	Liverpool (233), Aston Villa (11), Leeds United (51)	
14	(England) Cliff Holton	293	570	0.51	1950–1968	Arsenal (83), Watford (96), Northampton Town (50), Crystal Palace (40), Charlton Athletic (7), Leyton Orient (17)	
15	(England) Jimmy Hampson	290	425	0.68	1925–1938	Nelson (42), Blackpool (248)	
16	(England) Harry Morris	289	421	0.69	1920–1934	Fulham (2), Brentford (29), Millwall (30), Swansea Town (5), Swindon Town (215), Clapton Orient (8)	
16	(England) Ray Crawford	289	476	0.61	1957–1971	Portsmouth (9), Ipswich Town (143), Wolverhampton Wanderers (39), West Bromwich Albion (6), Ipswich Town (61), Charlton Athletic (7), Colchester United (24)	
18	(England) Ernie Hine	288	609	0.47	1921–1938	Barnsley (124), Leicester City (148), Huddersfield Town (4), Manchester United (12)	
19	(England) Tom Keetley	284	365	0.78	1919–1934	Bradford Park Avenue (5), Doncaster Rovers (180), Notts County (94), Lincoln City (5)	
20	(England) Alan Shearer	283	559	0.51	1987–2006	Southampton (23), Blackburn Rovers (112), Newcastle United (148)	
21	(England) Arthur Chandler	281	481	0.58	1920–1936	Queens Park Rangers (16), Leicester City (259), Notts County (6)	
22	(England) George Brown	276	445	0.62	1921–1938	Huddersfield Town (142), Aston Villa (79), Burnley (24), Leeds United (19), Darlington (12)	
22	(England) Ronnie Allen	276	638	0.43	1946–1965	Port Vale (34), West Bromwich Albion (208), Crystal Palace (34)	
22	(England) Teddy Sheringham ★	276	734	0.38	1983–2008	Millwall (93), Aldershot (0), Nottingham Forest (14), Tottenham Hotspur (98), Manchester United (31), Portsmouth (9), West Ham United (28), Colchester United (3)	
25	(Wales) Ron Davies	275	549	0.50	1959–1976	Chester (44), Luton Town (21), Norwich City (58), Southampton (134), Portsmouth (18), Manchester United (0), Millwall (0)	
26	(England) Roger Hunt	269	480	0.56	1959–1972	Liverpool (245), Bolton Wanderers (24)	
27	(England) Kevin Hector	268	662	0.40	1962–1982	Bradford Park Avenue (113), Derby County (155)	
28	(England) Ken Wagstaff	266	559	0.48	1960–1976	Mansfield Town (93), Hull City (173)	
29	(England) Pop Robson	265	674	0.39	1964–1986	Newcastle United (82), West Ham United (94), Sunderland (60), Carlisle United (26), Chelsea (3)	
29	(England) Billy Sharp	265	721	0.37	2004–2026	Sheffield United (117), Rushden & Diamonds (9), Scunthorpe United (53), Doncaster Rovers (60), Southampton (9), Nottingham Forest (10), Reading (2), Leeds United (5), Hull City (0)	
31	(England) Ted Harper	263	327	0.80	1923–1935	Blackburn Rovers (121), Sheffield Wednesday (13), Tottenham Hotspur (62), Preston North End (67)	
31	(England) Jamie Cureton	263	755	0.35	1994–2016	Norwich City (22), Bournemouth (0), Bristol Rovers (72), Reading (50), Queens Park Rangers (6), Swindon Town (7), Colchester United (27), Barnsley (2), Shrewsbury Town (0), Exeter City (39), Leyton Orient (1), Cheltenham Town (11), Dagenham & Redbridge (26)	
33	(England) David Jack	260	490	0.53	1920–1934	Plymouth Argyle (3), Bolton Wanderers (144), Arsenal (113)	
34	(England) Charlie Buchan ★	258	481	0.54	1910–1928	Sunderland (209), Arsenal (49)	
35	(England) Jimmy Cookson	256	292	0.88	1925–1938	Chesterfield (85), West Bromwich Albion (103), Plymouth Argyle (37), Swindon Town (31)	
35	(England) Tommy Briggs	256	390	0.66	1947–1959	Grimsby Town (87), Coventry City (7), Birmingham City (22), Blackburn Rovers (140)	
35	(Scotland) Ted MacDougall	256	535	0.48	1967–1981	York City (34), AFC Bournemouth (119), Manchester United (5), West Ham United (5), Norwich City (51), Southampton (42), Blackpool (0)	
38	(England) Charlie Wayman	255	382	0.67	1946–1958	Newcastle United (32), Southampton (73), Preston North End (105), Middlesbrough (31), Darlington (14)	
38	(England) Nat Lofthouse ★	255	452	0.56	1946–1961	Bolton Wanderers (255)	
40	(England) Keith Edwards	254	544	0.47	1975–1991	Sheffield United (143), Hull City (86), Leeds United (6), Stockport County (10), Huddersfield Town (8), Plymouth Argyle (1)	
41	(England) Steve Bull	252	478	0.53	1985–1999	West Bromwich Albion (2), Wolverhampton Wanderers (250)	
41	(England) Tommy Tynan	252	629	0.40	1975–1992	Swansea City (2), Sheffield Wednesday (31), Lincoln City (1), Newport County (66), Plymouth Argyle (125), Rotherham United (13), Torquay United (13), Doncaster Rovers (1)	
43	(England) Brian Clough	251	274	0.92	1955–1965	Middlesbrough (197), Sunderland (54)	
44	(England) Joe Bradford	250	419	0.60	1920–1936	Birmingham City (249), Bristol City (1)	
45	(Wales) Ivor Allchurch ★	249	691	0.36	1949–1968	Swansea Town (164), Newcastle United (46), Cardiff City (39)	
46	(England) Harry Hampton	248	410	0.60	1904–1923	Aston Villa (215), Birmingham (31), Newport County (2)	
47	(Wales) Ian Rush	246	570	0.43	1978–1999	Chester City (14), Liverpool (229), Leeds United (3), Newcastle United (0), Sheffield United (0), Wrexham (0)	
47	(England) Kevin Phillips	246	580	0.42	1994–2014	Watford (24), Sunderland (113), Southampton (22), Aston Villa (4), West Bromwich Albion (38), Birmingham (19), Blackpool (18), Crystal Palace (6), Leicester City (2)	
49	(England) Ernie Moss	245	749	0.33	1968–1988	Chesterfield (162), Peterborough United (9), Mansfield Town (21), Port Vale (23), Lincoln City (2), Doncaster Rovers (15), Stockport County (7), Scarborough (4), Rochdale (2)	
50	(Scotland) Dave Halliday	244	310	0.79	1925–1935	Sunderland (156), Arsenal (8), Manchester City (47), Clapton Orient (33)	
50	(England) Tom Waring	244	363	0.67	1927–1939	Tranmere Rovers (65), Aston Villa (159), Barnsley (7), Wolverhampton Wanderers (3), Accrington Stanley (10)	
50	(England) George Beel	244	457	0.53	1919–1933	Lincoln City (12), Merthyr Town (22), Chesterfield (23), Burnley (179), Rochdale (8)	
53	(England) Gordon Turner	243	406	0.60	1950–1964	Luton Town (243)	
54	(Wales) Tommy Bamford	242	338	0.72	1928–1939	Wrexham (175), Manchester United (53), Swansea Town (14)	
54	(England) Geoff Bradford	242	461	0.52	1949–1964	Bristol Rovers (242)	
56	(Scotland) Tommy Johnston	239	406	0.59	1951–1962	Darlington (9), Oldham Athletic (3), Norwich City (28), Newport County (46), Leyton Orient (121), Blackburn Rovers (22), Gillingham (10)	
56	(England) Dixie McNeil	239	522	0.46	1966–1983	Exeter City (11), Northampton Town (33), Lincoln City (53), Hereford United (88), Wrexham (54)	
58	(England) Ian Wright ★	236	493	0.48	1985–2000	Crystal Palace (90), Arsenal (128), West Ham United (9), Nottingham Forest (5), Burnley (4)	
59	(England) Derek Kevan	235	440	0.53	1952–1968	Bradford Park Avenue (8), West Bromwich Albion (157), Chelsea (1), Manchester City (48), Crystal Palace (5), Peterborough United (2), Luton Town (4), Stockport County (10)	
60	(England) Jack Cock	234	391	0.60	1914–1931	Huddersfield Town (9), Chelsea (47), Everton (29), Plymouth Argyle (72), Millwall (77)	
60	(England) Frank Worthington	234	757	0.31	1966–1988	Huddersfield Town (41), Leicester City (72), Bolton Wanderers (35), Birmingham City (29), Leeds United (14), Sunderland (2), Southampton (4), Brighton & Hove Albion (7), Tranmere Rovers (21), Preston North End (3), Stockport County (6)	
62	(England) Mick Channon	232	717	0.32	1965–1986	Southampton (185), Manchester City (24), Newcastle United (1), Bristol Rovers (0), Norwich City (16), Portsmouth (6)	
63	(England) Tommy Lawton ★	231	390	0.59	1935–1956	Burnley (16), Everton (65), Chelsea (30), Notts County (90), Brentford (17), Arsenal (13)	
63	(England) Kerry Dixon	231	592	0.39	1980–1997	Reading (51), Chelsea (147), Southampton (2), Luton Town (19), Millwall (9), Watford (0), Doncaster Rovers (3)	
65	(England) Andy Cole	230	509	0.45	1989–2008	Arsenal (0), Fulham (3), Bristol City (20), Newcastle United (55), Manchester United (94), Blackburn Rovers (27), Fulham (12), Manchester City (9), Portsmouth (3), Birmingham City (1), Sunderland (0), Burnley (6), Nottingham Forest (0)	
65	(England) Micky Quinn	230	515	0.45	1979–1995	Wigan Athletic (19), Stockport County (39), Oldham Athletic (34), Portsmouth (54), Newcastle United (59), Coventry City (25), Plymouth Argyle (0), Watford (0)	
67	(Wales) Brian Bedford	229	399	0.57	1954–1967	Reading (1), Southampton (2), Bournemouth (32), Queens Park Rangers (161), Scunthorpe United (23), Brentford (10)	
67	(England) Tony Brown	229	619	0.37	1963–1983	West Bromwich Albion (218), Torquay United (11)	
69	(Scotland) David Herd	228	427	0.53	1950–1970	Stockport County (6), Arsenal (97), Manchester United (114), Stoke City (11)	
69	(England) Pat Terry	228	494	0.46	1953–1969	Charlton Athletic (1), Newport County (30), Swansea City (9), Gillingham (60), Millwall (41), Northampton Town (10), Reading (42), Swindon Town (23), Brentford (12)	
69	(England) Francis Lee ★	228	500	0.46	1960–1976	Bolton Wanderers (92), Manchester City (112), Derby County (24)	
69	(England) Jackie Sewell	228	509	0.45	1946–1961	Notts County (97), Sheffield Wednesday (87), Aston Villa (36), Hull City (8)	
73	(England) Clarrie Bourton	227	357	0.64	1927–1939	Bristol City (14), Blackburn Rovers (37), Coventry City (173), Plymouth Argyle (3)	
73	(England) Harry Kane	227	373	0.61	2011–2023	Tottenham Hotspur (213), Leyton Orient (5), Millwall (7), Norwich City (0), Leicester City (2)	
75	(England) Horace Barnes	226	450	0.50	1908–1927	Derby County (74), Manchester City (120), Preston North End (16), Oldham Athletic (16)	
76	(England) Stan Mortensen ★	225	395	0.57	1946–1958	Blackpool (197), Hull City (18), Southport (10)	
76	(England) Tony Cottee	225	578	0.39	1982–2001	West Ham United (115), Everton (72), Leicester City (27), Birmingham City (1), Norwich City (1), Barnet (9), Millwall (0)	
78	(England) Allan Clarke	223	514	0.43	1963–1980	Walsall (41), Fulham (45), Leicester City (12), Leeds United (110), Barnsley (15)	
78	(England) Steve White	223	646	0.35	1977–1998	Bristol Rovers (44), Luton Town (25), Charlton Athletic (12), Lincoln City (0), Swindon Town (83), Hereford United (44), Cardiff City (15)	
80	(England) Tommy Thompson	222	444	0.50	1947–1964	Newcastle United (6), Aston Villa (67), Preston North End (116), Stoke City (17), Barrow (16)	
80	(England) Tommy Johnson	222	511	0.43	1919–1936	Manchester City (158), Everton (56), Liverpool (8)	
80	(Northern Ireland) Derek Dougan	222	546	0.41	1957–1975	Portsmouth (9), Blackburn Rovers (26), Aston Villa (19), Peterborough United (38), Leicester City (35), Wolverhampton Wanderers (95)	
80	(England) Marco Gabbiadini	222	659	0.34	1984–2004	York City (15), Sunderland (74), Crystal Palace (5), Derby County (50), Birmingham City (0), Oxford United (1), Stoke City (0), Darlington (47), Northampton Town (25), Hartlepool United (5)	
84	(England) Wally Ardron	221	305	0.72	1938–1955	Rotherham United (98), Nottingham Forest (123)	
84	(England) W. G. Richardson	221	349	0.63	1928–1939	Hartlepools United (19), West Bromwich Albion (202)	
86	(England) Martin Chivers	220	469	0.47	1962–1980	Southampton (97), Tottenham Hotspur (118), Norwich City (4), Brighton & Hove Albion (1)	
86	(Scotland) Jordan Rhodes	220	592	0.37	2007–2025	Ipswich Town (1), Rochdale (2), Brentford (7), Huddersfield Town (81), Blackburn Rovers (83), Middlesbrough (6), Sheffield Wednesday (18), Norwich City (6), Blackpool (15), Mansfield Town (1)	
88	(England) Jack Bowers	219	282	0.78	1928–1939	Derby County (167), Leicester City (52)	
89	(England) Bobby Smith	218	376	0.58	1950–1965	Chelsea (23), Tottenham Hotspur (176), Brighton & Hove Albion (19)	
89	(England) Dennis Viollet	218	441	0.49	1952–1967	Manchester United (159), Stoke City (59)	
89	(England) Len White	218	442	0.49	1950–1966	Rotherham United (15), Newcastle United (142), Huddersfield Town (37), Stockport County (24)	
89	(England) Bob Latchford	218	530	0.41	1968–1986	Birmingham City (68), Everton (106), Swansea City (35), Coventry City (2), Lincoln City (2), Newport County (5)	
89	(England) Rickie Lambert	218	607	0.36	1999–2017	Blackpool (0), Macclesfield Town (8), Stockport County (18), Rochdale (28), Bristol Rovers (51), Southampton (106), Liverpool (2), West Bromwich Albion (1), Cardiff City (4)	
94	(Scotland) Denis Law ★	217	458	0.47	1956–1974	Huddersfield Town (16), Manchester City (30), Manchester United (171)	
94	(England) Ray Charnley	217	465	0.47	1957–1970	Blackpool (193), Preston North End (4), Wrexham (5), Bradford Park Avenue (15)	
94	(Bermuda) Shaun Goater	217	552	0.39	1989–2006	Rotherham United (70), Notts County (0), Bristol City (40), Manchester City (84), Reading (12), Coventry City (0), Southend United (11)	
94	(England) Brian Clark	217	611	0.36	1960–1979	Bristol City (83), Huddersfield Town (11), Cardiff City (76), Bournemouth (12), Millwall (17), Newport County (18)	
98	(Scotland) Billy Liddell ★	216	492	0.44	1946–1961	Liverpool (216)	
99	(England) Bob Hatton	215	617	0.35	1966–1983	Wolverhampton Wanderers (7), Bolton Wanderers (2), Northampton Town (7), Carlisle United (37), Birmingham City (58), Blackpool (32), Luton Town (29), Sheffield United (34), Cardiff City (9)	
100	(England) Billy Walker	214	478	0.45	1919–1934	Aston Villa (214)	
100	(England) Wayne Rooney	214	521	0.41	2002–2020	Everton (25), Manchester United (183), Derby County (6)	
102	(England) Tony Richards	213	397	0.54	1954–1966	Walsall (183), Port Vale (30)	
102	(England) Alfie Biggs	213	512	0.42	1953–1969	Bristol Rovers (178), Preston North End (22), Walsall (9), Swansea Town (4)	
104	(Scotland) Alex Dawson	212	396	0.54	1956–1971	Manchester United (45), Preston North End (114), Bury (21), Brighton & Hove Albion (26), Brentford (6)	
104	(England) Geoff Hurst ★	212	529	0.40	1959–1976	West Ham United (180), Stoke City (30), West Bromwich Albion (2)	
104	(England) Tony Adcock	212	591	0.36	1980–1999	Colchester United (126), Manchester City (5), Northampton Town (40), Bradford City (6), Peterborough United (35), Luton Town (0)	
107	(England) Barrie Thomas	211	338	0.62	1954–1968	Leicester City (3), Mansfield Town (48), Scunthorpe United (93), Newcastle United (48), Barnsley (19)	
107	(England) Jimmy Murray	211	400	0.53	1955–1969	Wolverhampton Wanderers (155), Manchester City (43), Walsall (13)	
107	(England) Tony Hateley	211	434	0.49	1958–1974	Notts County (109), Aston Villa (68), Chelsea (6), Liverpool (17), Coventry City (4), Birmingham City (6), Oldham Athletic (1)	
110	(England) Dennis Westcott	210	321	0.65	1935–1953	New Brighton (10), Wolverhampton Wanderers (105), Blackburn Rovers (37), Manchester City (37), Chesterfield (21)	
110	(Northern Ireland) Jimmy Quinn	210	578	0.36	1981–2000	Swindon Town (40), Blackburn Rovers (17), Leicester City (6), Bradford City (14), West Ham United (18), Bournemouth (19), Reading (71), Peterborough United (25)	
112	(England) George Goddard	209	308	0.68	1926–1938	Queens Park Rangers (174)), Wolverhampton Wanderers (12), Sunderland (5), Southend United (18)	
112	(England) Raich Carter ★	209	444	0.47	1932–1952	Sunderland (118), Derby County (34), Hull City (57)	
112	(England) Frank Large	209	568	0.37	1958–1974	Halifax Town (50), Queens Park Rangers (5), Northampton Town (88), Swindon Town (4), Carlisle United (18), Oldham Athletic (18), Leicester City (8), Fulham (3), Chesterfield (15)	
115	(England) Jack Rowley	208	459	0.45	1936–1957	Bournemouth & Boscombe Athletic (12), Manchester United (182), Plymouth Argyle (14)	
115	(England) Peter Beardsley ★	208	658	0.32	1979–1999	Carlisle United (22), Newcastle United (107), Liverpool (46), Everton (25), Bolton Wanderers (2), Manchester City (0), Fulham (4), Hartlepool United (2)	
115	(England) Scott McGleish	208	692	0.30	1994–2012	Charlton Athletic (0), Leyton Orient (38), Peterborough United (0), Colchester United (44), Cambridge United (7), Barnet (36), Northampton Town (43), Wycombe Wanderers (33), Bristol Rovers (7)	
118	(England) Tommy Browell	207	386	0.54	1910–1930	Hull City (32), Everton (26), Manchester City (122), Blackpool (27)	
118	(England) Ron Saunders	207	391	0.53	1954–1967	Everton (0), Gillingham (20), Portsmouth (145), Watford (18), Charlton Athletic (24)	
118	(England) Luther Blissett	207	554	0.37	1975–1994	Watford (148), Bournemouth (56), West Bromwich Albion (1), Bury (1), Mansfield Town (1)	
118	(England) Bobby Charlton ★	207	644	0.32	1956–1975	Manchester United (199), Preston North End (8)	
122	(England) Sammy Collins	206	370	0.56	1946–1958	Bristol City (2), Torquay United (204)	
123	(England) Bobby Gurney	205	348	0.59	1925–1939	Sunderland (205)	
124	(England) George Elliott	203	345	0.59	1909–1925	Middlesbrough (203)	
124	(England) Billy Dickinson	203	387	0.52	1925–1939	Wigan Borough (61), Nottingham Forest (68), Rotherham United (43), Southend United (26), Hull City (5)	
126	(England) Ronnie Eyre	202	305	0.66	1923–1933	Sheffield Wednesday (0), Bournemouth (202)	
126	(England) Lee Hughes	202	470	0.43	1997–2014	West Bromwich Albion (89), Coventry City (15), Oldham Athletic (25), Blackpool (1), Notts County (59), Port Vale (13)	
126	(Wales) Iwan Roberts	202	647	0.31	1988–2005	Watford (9), Huddersfield Town (50), Leicester City (41), Wolverhampton Wanderers (12), Norwich City (84), Gillingham (3), Cambridge United (3)	
129	(England) Jack Connor	201	381	0.53	1946–1957	Ipswich Town (4), Carlisle United (12), Rochdale (42), Bradford City (7), Stockport County (132), Crewe Alexandra (4)	
129	(England) Peter Dobing	201	568	0.35	1956–1973	Blackburn Rovers (88), Manchester City (31), Stoke City (82)	
129	(Republic of Ireland) **James Collins**	201	597	0.34	2009–	Darlington (2), Burton Albion (4), Shrewsbury Town (42), Swindon Town (15), Northampton Town (8), Crawley Town (20), Luton Town (68), Cardiff City (3), Derby County (25), Lincoln City (14), **Doncaster Rovers (0)**	
132	(England) Jack Milsom	200	321	0.62	1928–1939	Rochdale (38), Bolton Wanderers (142), Manchester City (20)	
132	(England) Eddy Brown	200	399	0.50	1948–1961	Preston North End (16), Southampton (32), Coventry City (50), Birmingham City (74), Leyton Orient (28)	
132	(England) Roy Chapman	200	415	0.48	1953–1970	Aston Villa (8), Lincoln City (76), Mansfield Town (78), Port Vale (35), Chester (3)	
132	(England) Steve Phillips	200	562	0.36	1971–1988	Birmingham City (1), Torquay United (11), Northampton Town (38), Brentford (65), Southend United (66), Peterborough United (16), Exeter City (1), Chesterfield (2)	
132	(England) Bob Taylor	200	577	0.35	1985–2004	Leeds United (9), Bristol City (50), West Bromwich Albion (113), Bolton Wanderers (21), Cheltenham Town (7)	

== See also ==
- List of footballers in Scotland by number of league appearances
- List of footballers in England by number of league appearances
- List of footballers in Scotland by number of league goals
- List of English football first tier top scorers
