= Hugh Adcock =

English footballer (1903–1975)

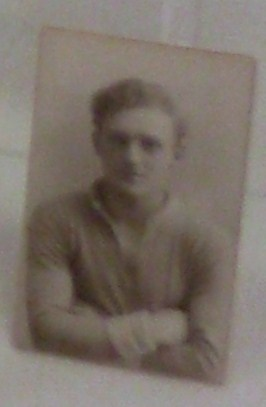

Personal information
- Full name: Hugh Adcock
- Date of birth: 10 April 1903
- Place of birth: Coalville, England
- Date of death: 16 October 1975 (aged 72)
- Height: 5 ft 5 1/2 in (1.66 m)
- Position: Outside right

Senior career*
Years	Team	Apps	(Gls)
	Ravenstone United	?	(?)
	Coalville Town	?	(?)
	Loughborough Corinthians	?	(?)
1923–1935	Leicester City	434	(51)
1935	Bristol Rovers	13	(1)
	Folkestone	?	(?)
	Ibstock Penistone Rovers	?	(?)

International career
	Football League	?	(?)
1929	England	5	(1)
- * Club domestic league appearances and goals

Hugh "Hughie" Adcock (born 10 April 1903 in Coalville, England – 16 October 1975) was an English footballer.

== Career ==
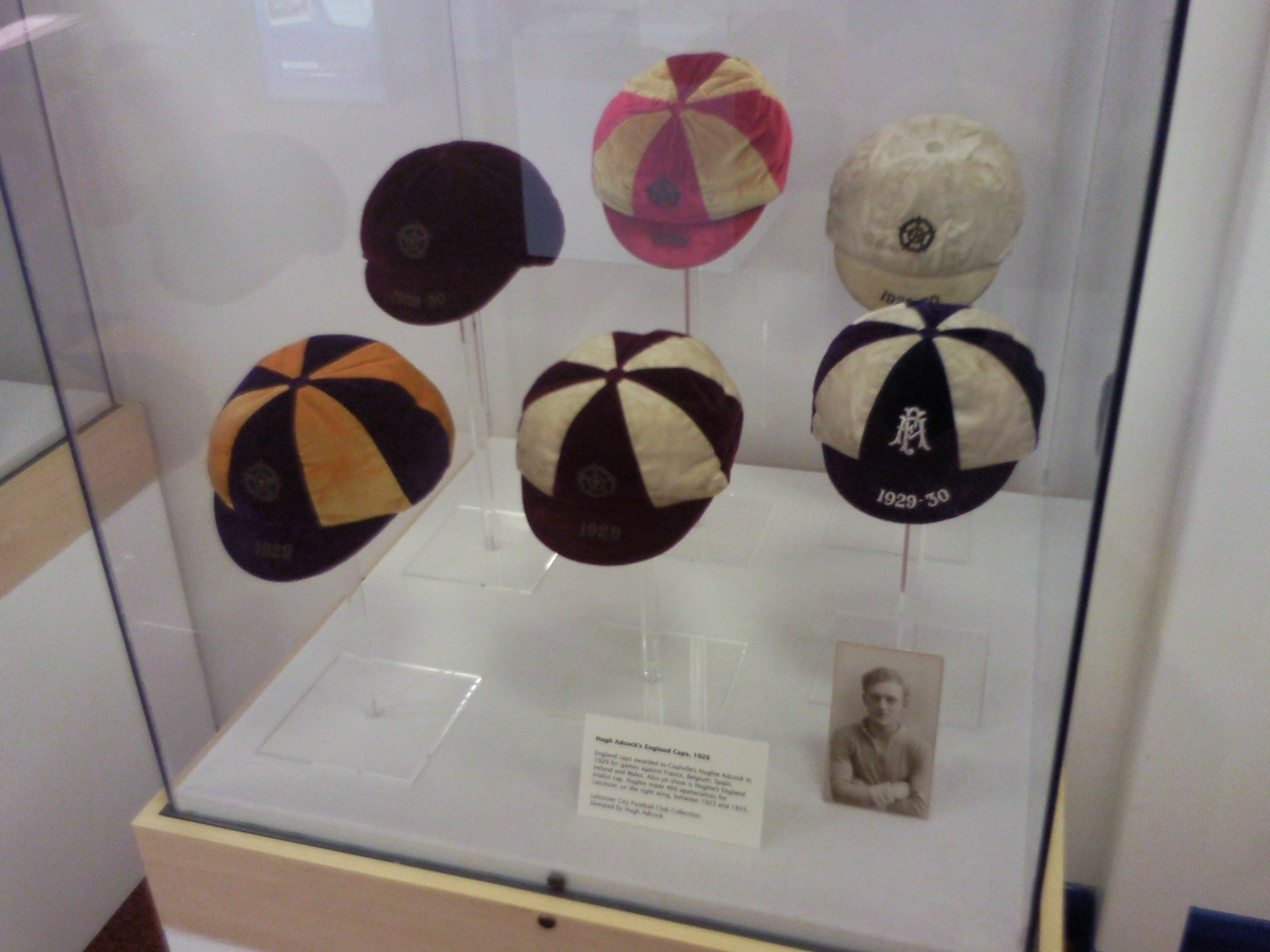
Adcock's five England caps and one from an England trial match on display in his home town of Coalville in 2010

=== Club ===
Adcock played for Ravenstone United, Coalville Town, Loughborough Corinthians, Bristol Rovers, Folkestone and Ibstock Penistone Rovers and most famously Leicester City.

He made his debut for Leicester on the same day as club record goalscorer Arthur Chandler and was a key player in the emergence of the Midlands' club under Peter Hodge in the mid-1920s and later the side which finished in the club's highest ever league finish of runners-up in the First Division in 1928-29. He made 440 appearances for the club over 13 years making him the club's joint 3rd record appearance holder.

=== International ===
He made five appearances and scored one goal for England.

== Honours ==
=== As a player ===
Leicester City

- Football League First Division Runner-up: 1928-29
- Football League Second Division Champion: 1924-25

England

- British Home Championship Winner: 1930
