= J. F. Reiger =

American politician (1858–1947)

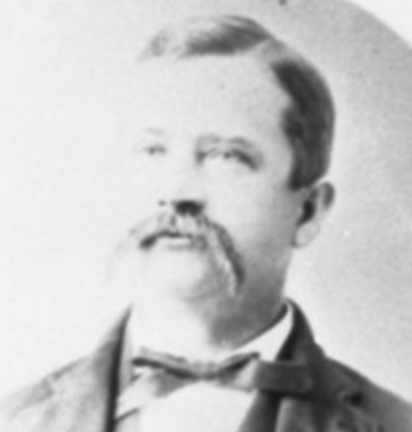
- Reiger in 1897

Member of the Texas House of Representatives from the 73rd district
- In office January 12, 1897 – January 10, 1899
- Preceded by: William Alexander Orr

Personal details
- Born: John Francis Reiger; March 23, 1858 Rochester, New York, US
- Died: June 11, 1947 (aged 89) Houston, Texas, US
- Party: Democratic
- Occupation: Politician, businessman

John Francis Reiger (March 23, 1858 – June 11, 1947) is an American politician and businessman.

== Early life ==
Reiger was born on March 23, 1858, in Rochester, New York. He left home at age 13, and moved to Elkhart County, Indiana to make cigars. He went out of business in 1877, and moved to Johnson County, Texas. There, he continued making cigars, as well as sheep farming with his brother George J. They sold their sheep in 1882, and Reiger became a stockbroker until 1890, when he sold his stocks and moved to Dallas to start the La Trinidad Cigar Factory with William L. Henry. On August 28, 1890, he married Mary Adalaid Rice.

A Democrat, Reiger was elected to the 25th Texas Legislature in 1897. During his tenure, he introduced a bill to give more power to labor unions, which passed. He also introduced a bill to regulate child labor, which failed to pass. After politics, he continued making cigars, as well as selling real estate in Houston. He also served as a judge for Houston's Sixth Ward. He died on June 11, 1947, aged 89, in Houston. Reiger Avenue in Houston is named for him.
