= Arthur Chandler (footballer) =

English footballer

Personal information
- Full name: Arthur Clarence Hillier Chandler
- Date of birth: 27 November 1895
- Place of birth: Paddington, England
- Date of death: 18 June 1984 (aged 88)
- Place of death: Leicester, England
- Height: 5 ft 8 in (1.73 m)
- Position: Striker

Youth career
- -1920: Handley Page

Senior career*
Years	Team	Apps	(Gls)
1920–1923	Queens Park Rangers	78	(16)
1923–1935	Leicester City	393	(259)
1935	Notts County	10	(6)
Total		481	(281)
- * Club domestic league appearances and goals

Arthur Clarence Hillier Chandler (27 November 1895 – 18 June 1984) was a professional footballer in the 1920s and 1930s. He is most famous at Leicester City, where he is the club's all-time record goal scorer, with 273 goals, who also played for Queens Park Rangers and Notts County.

As well as being Leicester's record goalscorer, Chandler also holds the club records for scoring the most goals in a single top flight season with 34, a record which he achieved twice. He scored the most top flight goals for the club with 203, also scoring the most hat-tricks, 17 in total, 12 coming in the first division. He is also the clubs joint record holder for the most goals in a single game, when he scored 6 goals at Filbert Street against Portsmouth on 20 October 1928. Johnny Duncan scored 6 on Christmas Day 1924 at home against Port Vale. Chandler notably held the record of being Leicester's oldest goalscorer (aged 39 years and 34 days) from 1935 through to 2014. Remarkably, despite his goalscoring feats, Chandler never scored a penalty. He took two penalties in his career, both of which were saved.

He was part of the Leicester side which finished in the club's highest ever [at that time] league finishes of First Division runners-up in 1928–29 and in third place in 1927–28.

== Early career ==
Paddington, London born centre forward Arthur Chandler began his football career with Handley Page after the end of the First World War, from where he signed for local newly elected Third Division club Queen's Park Rangers in August 1920, making his Football League debut at Crystal Palace in January 1921. he accrued 18 goals in 86 appearances,

== Leicester City ==
Chandler was already 27 years old when he was signed by Peter Hodge in June 1923 to bolster his attack after Leicester had narrowly missed out on promotion by goal average. He made 118 consecutive appearances (a then club record) from his club debut in a 1–1 draw vs Hull City on the opening day of the 1923–24 season (also debuting that day was fellow future Leicester great Hugh Adcock). He registered his first two goals two days later in a 5–0 victory over Stoke City." Chandler went on to net 27 goals in his debut season for Leicester, despite the club finishing in a disappointing 12th position. Though it was his second season in which Chandler really started to express himself. Forming a lethal goalscoring partnership with Johnny Duncan, the pair scored an incredible 62 league goals between them as Leicester won the Second Division title and Chandler claimed the Second Division Golden Boot, beating team-mate Duncan by 2 goals to the award.

Under the stewardship of Hodge and later Willie Orr Leicester established themselves as a strong First Division force, with Chandler heading a lethal forward line which also included Ernie Hine and Arthur Lochhead (the three of them would go on to score nearly 550 goals for the club between them and all three still sit among Leicester's top 5 goalscorers of all-time). In 1927–28 and 1928–29 as the club finished in its highest ever league finishes of 3rd and 2nd respectively, now in his mid 30s Chandler reached the top of his game, hitting 34 league goals in both seasons, still a club record for the most goals in a single season in the top flight. It was also at this time in which Chandler played his most famous game: On 20 October 1928 Chandler scored six goals against Portsmouth in Leicester's biggest league win, a 10–0 Division One victory at Filbert Street. The event has become known as "the six swans" among Leicester fans, because five swans flew over Filbert Street that day just after Chandler had scored his fifth of these goals. A sixth swan then flew over several minutes later and Chandler promptly responded scoring his sixth goal of the afternoon. He played for the "Professionals" in the 1929 FA Charity Shield.

Chandler remained at the club until June 1935, although not a first team regular in his final few seasons due to his age, he became the club's oldest goalscorer when he netted his final goal for the club against Wolverhampton Wanderers on 29 December 1934 aged 39 years and 34 days. He had a brief spell at Notts County, signing on 21 June 1935, before retiring as a player.

Chandler returned to Leicester City after his career ended in 1936 in a variety of backroom roles until his eventual retirement in 1969 at the age of 73.

On 13 December 1961 City played an Arthur Chandler's X1 in a testimonial match.

He died in a nursing home in Leicester in June 1984.

== Leicester City statistics ==
Arthur Chandler's record in his 13 years at Leicester.

Season	Club	Division	League		FA Cup		Total	
Season	Club	Division	Apps	Goals	Apps	Goals	Apps	Goals
1923–24	Leicester City	Second Division	42	24	1	0	43	24
1924–25	Leicester City	Second Division	42	32	6	6	48	38
1925–26	Leicester City	First Division	38	26	1	0	39	26
1926–27	Leicester City	First Division	34	28	1	1	35	29
1927–28	Leicester City	First Division	41	34	3	0	44	34
1928–29	Leicester City	First Division	40	34	3	0	43	34
1929–30	Leicester City	First Division	38	32	1	0	39	32
1930–31	Leicester City	First Division	37	18	1	0	38	18
1931–32	Leicester City	First Division	33	12	3	2	36	14
1932–33	Leicester City	First Division	13	4	0	0	13	4
1933–34	Leicester City	First Division	12	6	4	5	16	11
1934–35	Leicester City	First Division	23	9	2	0	25	9
Total			393	259	26	14	419	273

== Honours and achievements ==
Leicester City

- Football League First Division runner-up 1928–29
- Football League Second Division champions 1924–25

Individual

- Football League Second Division top goalscorer 1924–25
- Leicester City All-Time Leading Goalscorer: 273 Goals
- Leicester City All-Time Leading League Goalscorer: 259 Goals
- Leicester City All-Time Leading Goalscorer in the first tier (Premier League and predecessors): 203 Goals
- Leicester City All-Time Leading Goalscorer in the FA Cup: 14 Goals (Joint record)

== See also ==
- List of English football first tier top scorers
- List of footballers in England by number of league goals
