= Johnny Orr (footballer) =

Scottish footballer

Personal information
- Full name: John Tait Orr
- Date of birth: 15 December 1888
- Place of birth: Leith, Scotland
- Date of death: 13 May 1971 (aged 82)
- Place of death: Leith, Scotland
- Height: 5 ft 6 in (1.68 m)
- Position: Inside forward

Youth career
- Leith Renton

Senior career*
Years	Team	Apps	(Gls)
1906–1908	Newtongrange Star		
1908–1920	Blackburn Rovers	75	(30)
1922–1926	Leith Athletic	35	(14)
- * Club domestic league appearances and goals

John Tait Orr (15 December 1888 – 13 May 1971) was a Scottish footballer who played as an inside forward. Having moved from Newtongrange Star to Blackburn Rovers as a teenager in January 1908, he was often a reserve for the likes of Eddie Latheron, Jock Simpson, Danny Shea and compatriot Walter Aitkenhead, but had a role in the squads which won the English Football League championship in 1911–12 and 1913–14. Towards the end of the latter season, he was selected for the Home Scots v Anglo-Scots international trial match, but this did not lead on to a full cap.

The outbreak of the First World War in 1914 disrupted football and led to official competitions in England being cancelled a year later; during the conflict, Orr agreed to play some matches for Blackburn's local rivals Burnley and also featured for Preston North End, but otherwise missed out on what would probably have been the peak years of his sporting career, and joined the British Army in 1917. He remained on Blackburn's books until the end of the 1919–20 season, but made only three post-war league appearances due to injury (despite some callous newspaper reports having predicted that after demobilisation from the armed forces, "he is certain of his place now" – Latheron having been killed in the war). Orr returned to Scotland and made a comeback in his 30s playing for hometown club Leith Athletic in minor competitions including the Scottish Football Alliance, and for two seasons in the Scottish Football League Division Three. A benefit match was played for him in 1926.

His uncle Willie Orr was also a football player (Celtic, Scotland) and manager (Airdrieonians, Leicester City).
