= Derek Hines =

English footballer

Personal information
- Date of birth: 18 February 1931
- Place of birth: Woodville, Derbyshire, England
- Date of death: 1 August 2001 (aged 70)
- Place of death: Derbyshire, England
- Position: Forward

Youth career
- 1946–1948: Derby County

Senior career*
Years	Team	Apps	(Gls)
1948–1961	Leicester City	299	(116)
1961–1962	Shrewsbury Town	16	(5)
1964–1965	Rugby Town		
- * Club domestic league appearances and goals

Derek Jabez Hines (8 February 1931 - August 2001) was an English football player who played for Derby County, Shrewsbury Town, Rugby Town and most notably Leicester City.

During his time at Leicester he forged a prolific strike partnership with Arthur Rowley and helped Leicester to the Second Division title in both 1953-54 and 1956-57. He scored 117 goals in total for the club making him the club's 4th top goalscorer of all-time. He is also the last person to score 4 goals in one game for the club in a 6-3 victory over Aston Villa in November 1958.

He returned to the club for a spell as youth team coach in the 1970s.
