= Adam Black (footballer, born 1898) =

Scottish footballer (1898–1981)

Personal information
- Full name: Adam Hudson Black
- Date of birth: 18 February 1898
- Place of birth: Denny, Scotland
- Date of death: 30 August 1981 (aged 83)
- Height: 5 ft 9 1/2 in (1.77 m)
- Position: Full back

Senior career*
Years	Team	Apps	(Gls)
1919–1920	Bathgate		
1920–1935	Leicester City	528	(4)
- * Club domestic league appearances and goals

Adam Hudson Black (18 February 1898 – 30 August 1981) was a Scottish footballer who played for Leicester City in the Football League in the 1920s and 1930s.

He played for Leicester between January 1920 and 1935 and made a total of 557 senior appearances, including 528 in the Football League, the Foxes club record.

== Early life ==
Born in Denny, prior to joining Leicester Black fought in World War I with the Argyll and Sutherland Highlanders and won the Distinguished Conduct Medal for his gallantry near Mœuvres on 21 March 1918. The citation for his DCM stated that Black "bombed out a large portion of a trench captured by the enemy in spite of strenuous opposition. His initiative, leadership and personal gallantry were worthy of the highest praise".

== Career ==
Black made his debut for Leicester on 24 January 1920 in a 3–2 victory over Hull City after becoming one of Peter Hodge's first signings for the club and began to establish himself as a first team regular the following season. Over the following few seasons under Hodge, Leicester were slowly built into a Second Division force and Black helped the club to the Second Division title in 1924–25. Black later played a key role as part of the team which finished in the club's second highest league finish of runners-up in the First Division in 1928–29. He progressed to captain the team.

Despite playing 557 times for Leicester, he only managed to score four times. Three of his goals were penalties and the other a bizarre 60-yard free kick against Sunderland in 1933, which Black accidentally overhit. He made his final Leicester appearance in February 1935.

He played in the Home Scots v Anglo-Scots trial match in 1923.

== Legacy ==
A suite at Leicester's home ground, the King Power Stadium, is named in his honour.

== Personal life ==
Black married in Clydebank in 1920. His brother John Black (born 1900) also played football for various Football League teams.

== Honours ==
- Football League First Division Runner-up: 1928–29
- Football League Second Division Champions: 1924–25

== Records ==
- All-Time Leicester City F.C. leader in league appearances: 528 games.
- Black and Jack Bamber were the first Leicester players to play all games in a First Division season, in 1925–26.
