= 1929–30 British Home Championship =

Tournament details
- Host country: England, Ireland, Scotland and Wales
- Dates: 19 October 1929 – 5 April 1930
- Teams: 4

Final positions
- Champions: England (21st title)
- Runners-up: Scotland

Tournament statistics
- Matches played: 6
- Goals scored: 33 (5.5 per match)
- Top scorer: (Scotland) Hughie Gallacher (8 goals)

The 1929–30 British Home Championship was an edition of the annual international football tournament played between the British Home Nations. 1930 was the year in which the tournament finally gained a serious rival as the premier international football competition, with the inception of the 1930 FIFA World Cup, held in Uruguay. The Home Nations were not however members of FIFA due to disputes over the growing professionalism in continental and South American football. As a result, they were not able to attend and indicated that even if they were invited they would have no interest in attending, deeming foreign opposition too weak for serious contest. The England team, which dominated the 1930 championship, had lost to Spain the year before in the first defeat by a foreign football team, and in the same year they only managed draws with Germany and Austria. The Scottish side, which had won most of the previous ten championships, was likewise unprepared, only playing its first game outside the British Isles in 1929, and being heavily defeated on tour in 1931 by both the Austrians and the Italians.

The tournament reflected the highly attacking style of play popular in Britain at the time, with very high scoring in all games, the lowest total was three and two games saw seven goals and two more six. The English won all three matches at a canter, scoring fourteen goals and brushing aside their opposition to take the title. The fancied Scots also performed well, winning against Wales and Northern Ireland before succumbing to England in the final match. In the decider for last place, the Irish hammered the Welsh seven goals to nil at Windsor Park, taking third place in an exciting competition which even at this stage many still considered the world's most prestigious.

== Table ==
| Team | Pld | W | D | L | GF | GA | GD | Pts |
|---|---|---|---|---|---|---|---|---|
| England (C) | 3 | 3 | 0 | 0 | 14 | 2 | +12 | 6 |
| Scotland | 3 | 2 | 0 | 1 | 9 | 8 | +1 | 4 |
| Ireland | 3 | 1 | 0 | 2 | 8 | 6 | +2 | 2 |
| Wales | 3 | 0 | 0 | 3 | 2 | 17 | −15 | 0 |

Rules for classification: 1) points. The points system worked as follows: 2 points for a win and 1 point for a draw.
(C) Champions

== Results ==
19 October 1929

| Ireland | 0–3 | England |
|---|---|---|
| | | Camsell; Hine (pen.) |

Windsor Park, Belfast

26 October 1929

| Wales | 2–4 | Scotland |
|---|---|---|
| O'Callaghan 47'; L. Davies 48' | | Gallacher 7', 20'; James 82'; Gibson 88' |

Ninian Park, Cardiff
Attendance: 25,000
Referee: William McLean (Ireland)

22 November 1929

| England | 6–0 | Wales |
|---|---|---|
| Camsell; Johnson; Adcock |

Wembley Stadium, London

1 February 1930

| Ireland | 7–0 | Wales |
|---|---|---|
| Bambrick; McCluggage |

Celtic Park, Belfast

22 February 1930

| Scotland | 3–1 | Ireland |
|---|---|---|
| Gallacher 31', 61'; Stevenson 72' | | McCaw 39' |

Celtic Park, Glasgow
Attendance: 31,808
Referee: Arthur Joseph (England)

5 April 1930

| England | 5–2 | Scotland |
|---|---|---|
| Watson 11', 28'; Rimmer 30', 55'; Jack 33' | | Fleming 49', 62' |

Wembley Stadium, London
Attendance: 87,375
Referee: William McLean (Ireland)
