= 25th Texas Legislature =

The 25th Texas Legislature met from January 12, 1897, to May 21, 1897, and again in a special called session from May 22, 1897, to June 20, 1897.
