= Johnny Anderson (footballer) =

Scottish footballer

Personal information
- Full name: John Anderson
- Date of birth: 8 December 1929
- Place of birth: Barrhead, Scotland
- Date of death: 22 August 2001 (aged 71)
- Place of death: Leicester, England
- Position: Goalkeeper

Senior career*
Years	Team	Apps	(Gls)
1948–1959	Leicester City	261	(0)
1960–1961	Peterborough United	?	(?)

International career
1954	Scotland	1	(0)
- * Club domestic league appearances and goals

John Anderson (8 December 1929 – 22 August 2001) was a Scottish footballer, who played as a goalkeeper.

Anderson was born in Barrhead and began his career with junior side Arthurlie. He moved in December 1948 to Leicester City, where he won two Division 2 championships. Later in his career Anderson played for Peterborough United during their debut Football League season (1960–61) and for Nuneaton Borough. On retiring from playing football he set up a painting and decorating business in Leicester.

He won his only cap for Scotland in their final preparation match for the 1954 FIFA World Cup, against Finland. Although he was named in the finals squad as understudy to Fred Martin, Anderson did not travel to Switzerland as Scotland chose only to take 13 players. Anderson stayed at home on reserve, along with the likes of Bobby Combe and Jimmy Binning. Inside forward George Hamilton was also on reserve but travelled after Bobby Johnstone withdrew through injury.
