= Arthur Rowley =

English football player and cricketer

Personal information
- Full name: George Arthur Rowley Jr.
- Date of birth: 21 April 1926
- Place of birth: Wolverhampton, England
- Date of death: 18 December 2002 (aged 76)
- Place of death: Shrewsbury, England
- Position: Inside left

Youth career
- 1941–1944: Manchester United

Senior career*
Years	Team	Apps	(Gls)
1946–1948	West Bromwich Albion	24	(4)
1948–1950	Fulham	56	(27)
1950–1958	Leicester City	303	(251)
1958–1965	Shrewsbury Town	236	(152)
Total		619	(434)

Managerial career
- 1958–1968: Shrewsbury Town
- 1968–1969: Sheffield United
- 1970–1976: Southend United
- c.1976: Knighton Town
- * Club domestic league appearances and goals

George Arthur Rowley Jr. (21 April 1926 – 18 December 2002), nicknamed "The Gunner" because of his explosive left-foot shot, was an English football player and cricketer. He holds the record for the most goals in the history of English league football, scoring 434 from 619 league games. He was the younger brother of Manchester United footballer Jack Rowley. He was shortlisted for inclusion into the English Football Hall of Fame in 2008.

He holds the club record for the most goals in a single season at both Leicester City and Shrewsbury Town, scoring 44 goals in 42 league matches at Leicester in 1956–57 and 38 goals in 43 games for Shrewsbury in 1958–59. He is also Shrewsbury's record league goalscorer with 152 league goals. He is Leicester's second all-time top goalscorer, netting 265 times for the Foxes, 8 goals short of Arthur Chandler's record.

== Early life ==
George Arthur Rowley was the third son of Mark Rowley, a well known goalkeeper playing semi-professionally in the Birmingham League. Born in Wolverhampton where he was educated at Dudley Road School and later at St Peter's Collegiate School, he started his career originally as a centre-half before moving up front where his prowess in the forward line won him an early selection into the school's first team. He went on to win local honours with Wolverhampton and County honours with both Birmingham and Staffordshire. He was selected for England schoolboys but the outbreak of the war robbed him of the opportunity.

== Playing career ==
=== Manchester United ===
On leaving school in 1940, Rowley went to work for a sheet metal firm doing war work before joining his older brother Jack in Manchester. Thus Rowley began his career at Manchester United, signing as an Amateur just four days after his 15th birthday. The following day, 26 April 1941, at 15 years and 5 days old, he became the youngest ever player to feature in the Manchester United first team when he lined up alongside Jack in a war-time league match against Liverpool at Anfield.

Rowley went on to play seven times for the United first team before being released in May 1944.

=== West Bromwich Albion ===
Rowley also played regularly as an amateur at Wolverhampton Wanderers as guest during the war, before turning professional with West Bromwich Albion later in the summer of 1944. However, he struggled at The Hawthorns both to score goals and gain a regular place in the first team.

=== Fulham ===
Albion sold Rowley early in the 1948–49 season to Fulham, where he immediately found his goal-scoring touch, scoring 19 goals in 22 appearances as he helped the side to the Second Division title.

Rowley failed to recapture his form in the First Division as he scored only 7 goals.

=== Leicester City ===
At the end of his first season in the top flight he was sold to Leicester City. There was much criticism from Leicester fans originally towards manager Norman Bullock on signing the relatively unproven Rowley as a replacement for the well-liked Jack Lee. However, after a slow start as a centre forward, Bullock moved Rowley into the "number 10" inside left role which is where he would make his name at the Foxes, on 23 September, in which Rowley scored Leicester's consolation goal in a 2–1 defeat to Coventry City." By the end of his debut season, his 28 goals had appeased the crowd, though the club still finished in a disappointing 14th position.

It was in his second season that Rowley began to make a name for himself as he broke Arthur Chandler's club record for the most goals in a season, netting 38 times. He then broke his own record again the following season, scoring 41 times in 42 games, 39 of these goals coming in the league, making him the Second Division top goalscorer. He scored a further 36 goals in the 1953–54 season helping fire Leicester to the Second Division title.

However, Leicester lasted just one season in the First Division as they were relegated back to the second tier at the first attempt. A couple of seasons later, in 1956–57, Rowley broke the club record for the most goals in a season for the third time, scoring 44 times in 42 games (this record still stands today), again making him the Second Division top goalscorer and again leading Leicester to the Second Division title. Rowley scored a further 20 times in 25 games in 1957–58 to help Leicester this time avoid relegation back to the second tier.

However Dave Halliday decided to sell Rowley in the summer of 1958 when he was just 8 goals short of Arthur Chandler's club record for the all-time top goalscorer. This led to a loss of faith by the fans and ultimately his sacking 2 months into the 1958–59 season.

In his 8 seasons at Filbert Street overall, Rowley scored 265 goals in 321 games, including 16 hat-tricks.

=== Shrewsbury Town ===
In the summer of 1958 Rowley left Leicester, who were playing in the First Division, to become the player-manager of Shrewsbury Town of the newly created Fourth Division. In his first season at the Gay Meadow Rowley led Shrewsbury to promotion with a haul of 38 goals in 43 games, making him the Fourth Division top goalscorer. He followed that up in the Third Division as he continued scoring prolifically, netting 32, 28, 23 and 24 times over the next four seasons, before falling away in his last couple of seasons with the club as he began to put on weight and became less mobile, but his influence on the pitch was still to be seen, even employing himself as a makeshift defender on occasion, before finally retiring in 1965.

== Management career ==
=== Sheffield United ===
After retiring as a player Rowley managed Shrewsbury for another four years before becoming manager of Sheffield United on 11 July 1968. United had just been relegated to Division Two but despite good signings who would later gain the team promotion, results were disappointing and he was sacked on 6 August 1969.

He managed Southend United from 1970 to 1976 and was also assistant manager of Telford United and manager of non-league Knighton Town and Oswestry Town before leaving football.

== Cricketing career ==
Rowley represented Shropshire in three Minor Counties Championship matches between 1961 and 1962 as a right-handed batsman and a leg break bowler, and played at club level for Rolls-Royce in Shrewsbury.

== Later life ==
Rowley made his home in the suburb of Copthorne, Shrewsbury. He continued to visit the Gay Meadow as a spectator. In 2000, he was voted by Shrewsbury Town their 'player of the century'. He died in December 2002 aged 76 and was buried on Saturday 26 December (Boxing Day) in Shrewsbury General Cemetery in Longden Road. His headstone, in Plot 18, describes him as a "record breaking football hero".

== Honours ==
Fulham

- Second Division champions: 1948–49

Leicester City

- Second Division champions: 1953–54, 1956–57

Individual

- Second Division top goalscorer: (with Leicester City) 1952–53, 1956–57
- Fourth Division top goalscorer: (with Shrewsbury Town) 1958–59

== Career statistics ==
Appearances and goals by club, season and competition
Club	Season	League			FA Cup		Total	
Club	Season	Division	Apps	Goals	Apps	Goals	Apps	Goals
West Bromwich Albion	1946–47	Second Division	2	0	0	0	2	0
West Bromwich Albion	1947–48	Second Division	21	4	0	0	21	4
West Bromwich Albion	1948–49	Second Division	1	0	0	0	1	0
West Bromwich Albion	Total		24	4	0	0	24	4
Fulham	1948–49	Second Division	22	19	1	0	23	19
Fulham	1949–50	First Division	34	8	2	0	36	8
Fulham	Total		56	27	3	0	59	27
Leicester City	1950–51	Second Division	39	28	1	0	40	28
Leicester City	1951–52	Second Division	42	38	2	0	44	38
Leicester City	1952–53	Second Division	41	39	1	2	42	41
Leicester City	1953–54	Second Division	42	30	8	6	50	36
Leicester City	1954–55	First Division	36	23	1	0	37	23
Leicester City	1955–56	Second Division	36	29	3	6	39	35
Leicester City	1956–57	Second Division	42	44	1	0	43	44
Leicester City	1957–58	First Division	25	20	1	0	26	20
Leicester City	Total		303	251	18	14	321	265
Shrewsbury Town	1958–59	Fourth Division	43	38	5	1	48	39
Shrewsbury Town	1959–60	Third Division	41	32	1	1	42	33
Shrewsbury Town	1960–61	Third Division	40	28	13	4	53	32
Shrewsbury Town	1961–62	Third Division	41	23	7	6	48	29
Shrewsbury Town	1962–63	Third Division	40	24	5	3	45	27
Shrewsbury Town	1963–64	Third Division	19	5	0	0	19	5
Shrewsbury Town	1964–65	Third Division	12	2	0	0	12	2
Shrewsbury Town	Total		236	152	31	15	267	167
Career total			619	434	52	29	671	463

== See also ==
- List of men's footballers with 500 or more goals
