= Archie Gardiner =

Scottish footballer

Personal information
- Full name: Archibald Gardiner
- Date of birth: 17 March 1913
- Place of birth: Penicuik, Midlothian, Scotland
- Position: Forward

Senior career*
Years	Team	Apps	(Gls)
1931–1934	Hearts	24	(16)
1934	Leicester City	18	(11)
1934–1936	Wrexham	45	(12)
- Hamilton Academical
- * Club domestic league appearances and goals

Archibald Gardiner (born 17 March 1913) was a Scottish professional footballer who played as a forward. He made appearances in the English Football League with Leicester City and Wrexham. He was convicted of theft in 1938 and fined.
