= Arthur Woolliscroft =

English footballer

Arthur Woolliscroft (17 February 1904 – 1977, also known as Arthur Wooliscroft) was an English professional footballer, who played as an inside forward.

Born in Salford, Lancashire, Woolliscroft started his professional career at Manchester City. He briefly played for Welsh side Caernarfon Athletic, before signing for Leicester City for £400 in March 1929. Nine months later he transferred to Watford, for whom he made 67 first team appearances over three seasons, scoring 16 goals. After leaving Watford, Wooliscroft finished his career at Newport County and Northwich Victoria.

He died in Salford in 1977.
