= William Alexander Orr =

American politician (1836–1913)

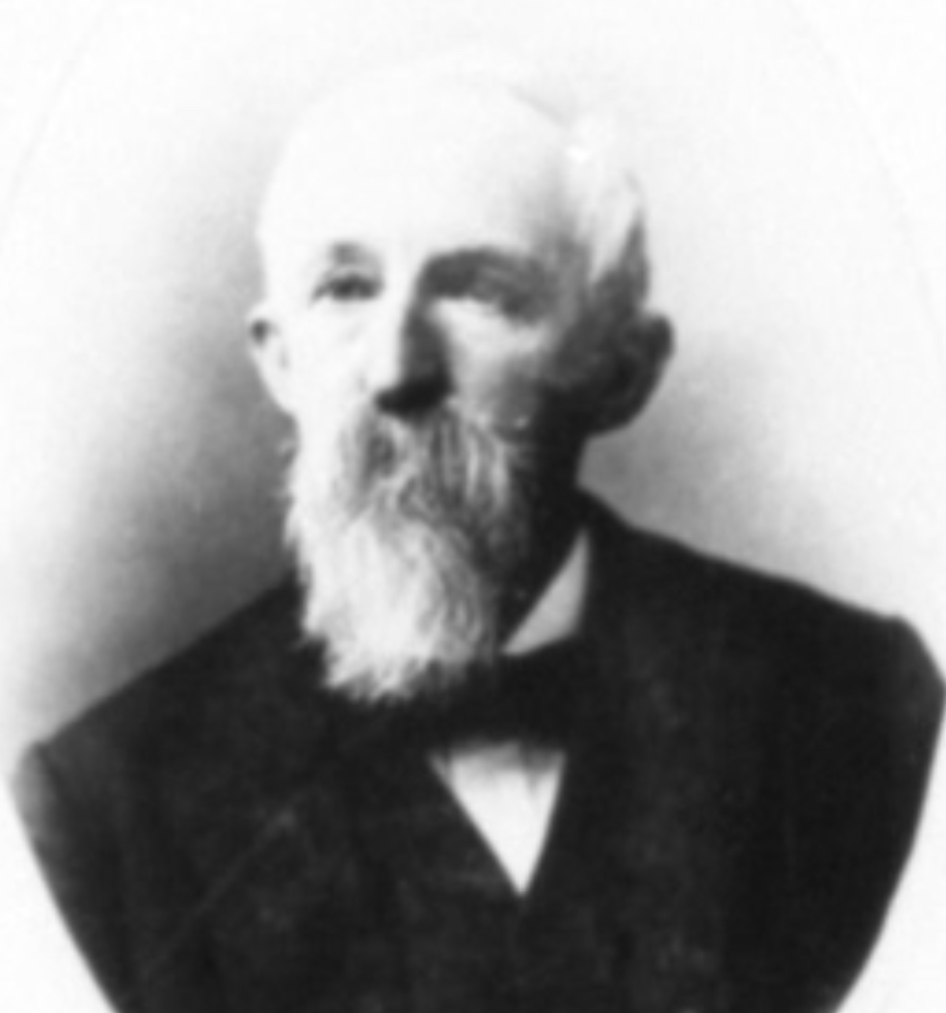
- Orr between 1895 and 1897

Member of the Texas House of Representatives from the 73rd district
- In office January 8, 1895 – January 12, 1897
- Succeeded by: J. F. Reiger

Personal details
- Born: November 20, 1836 Greene County, Georgia, US
- Died: December 2, 1913 (aged 77) Ferris, Texas, US
- Party: Democratic
- Children: 3
- Occupation: Politician
- Nickname: "The Red Fox"

Military service
- Branch/service: Confederate States Army
- Rank: Second Lieutenant
- Battles/wars: American Civil War

William "The Red Fox" Alexander Orr (November 20, 1836 – December 2, 1913) was an American politician.

== Biography ==
Orr was born on November 20, 1836, in Greene County, Georgia. His parents were William Gillespie and Jane M. Orr (née Harris), and he had five brothers and four sisters. His family moved to Alabama, eventually settling near Jefferson, Texas. He attended the University of North Carolina at Chapel Hill. A slaveowner, he was enlisted to the 9th Texas Cavalry Regiment during the American Civil War, achieving the rank of second lieutenant by May 1862. In 1865, he married Caroline Matilda Smart, having 3 children together.

After the war, he farmed in Longview. He later moved near Lancaster, eventually living near Wilmer. From 1882 to 1894, he served as commissioner of Dallas County, during which he supervised drilling of the county's first well, and gained the nicknamed "the Red Fox".

A Democrat, he was elected to the Texas House of Representatives from the 73rd district, serving from January 8, 1895, to January 12, 1897. He was appointed to several committees, namely ones on economics and development. While serving, he introduced eight bills, only one bill – the "Orr road law" – passed, which allowed county commissioners to oversee their roads. He also voted in favor of prizefighting, stating it to be the view of his constituency. He lost the re-election to J. F. Reiger, 2,192 to 2,135.

After losing the election, his family moved to Ferris to farm. He directed banks and owned much ranch land. He then moved to Burleson in 1909, dying there on December 2, 1913, aged 77. He is buried in Burleson Memorial Cemetery, in Burleston.
