= Bill Orr (football coach) =

Scottish football coach and analyst

Personal information
- Full name: Bill Orr
- Date of birth: 23 May 1983 (age 43)
- Place of birth: Clydebank, Scotland
- Height: 6 ft 0 in (1.83 m)

Team information
- Current team: Greenock Morton

Managerial career
- Years: Team
- 2018–2018: Greenock Juniors (Head of Scouting)
- 2018–2019: Queens Park (Head of Performance Analysis)
- 2019–2022: Stirling Albion (First Team Coach)
- 2022–2023: East Kilbride (Assistant Manager)
- 2023–2025: Raith Rovers (Head of Performance Analysis)
- 2026–Present: Greenock Morton (First Team Coach)

Bill Orr (born 23 May 1983) is a Scottish football coach/analyst,

== Career ==
Orr spent more than a decade as a First Team manager in Amateur and Junior football before joining Queen’s Park’s academy as Head of Performance Analysis. He subsequently moved to Stirling Albion, serving as First Team Coach Analyst under manager Kevin Rutkiewicz. When Rutkiewicz was appointed manager of East Kilbride in March 2023, Orr joined him as Assistant Manager where the pair won the Lowland League Cup. Both departed the club following Rutkiewicz’s resignation In March 2023.

In January 2023, Orr was invited by the Football Association of Ireland to work with the Republic of Ireland Under-17 squad.

Following the 2023 takeover of Raith Rovers by a consortium led by Dean McKenzie, Orr was appointed Head of Performance Analysis and Talent Identification. In this role he oversaw technical coaching for first-team players, recruitment, data and performance analysis.

Orr left Raith Rovers in October 2025 to pursue a more coaching-focused role, also expressing disappointment with the handling of manager Ian Murray’s dismissal the previous month.

In January 2026, Orr joined Greenock Morton as First Team Coach under manager Ian Murray. He re-joined Murray’s back-room staff after previously working with him at Raith Rovers

He is recognised as one of the first performance analysts to be employed in the Scottish lower leagues.

== Personal life ==
Orr attended Braidfield high school in Clydebank.
