= Willie Orr =

Scottish footballer and manager

Personal information
- Full name: William Orr
- Date of birth: 20 June 1873
- Place of birth: Shotts, Scotland
- Date of death: 26 February 1946 (aged 72)
- Place of death: Airdrie, Scotland
- Position: Defender

Youth career
- Airdrie Fruitfield

Senior career*
Years	Team	Apps	(Gls)
1893–1894	Airdrieonians	0	(0)
1894–1897	Preston North End	69	(2)
1897–1908	Celtic	164	(18)
Total		233	(20)

International career
1900–1904	Scotland	3	(0)

Managerial career
- 1921–1926: Airdrieonians
- 1926–1932: Leicester City
- 1932–1935: Falkirk
- * Club domestic league appearances and goals

William Orr (20 June 1873 – 26 February 1946) was a Scottish football player and manager.

== Playing career ==
Orr began his career at Airdrieonians before moving to Preston North End in 1894. It was at Celtic though where he made his name. He made his debut in a 4–1 victory over Hibernian in 1897 and helped lead Celtic to the Scottish Football League title in his first season there, followed by a Scottish Cup win in 1900. A strong, assured left back, Orr's influence as a leader shone after he became Celtic captain in 1902 and he led the club to three further league championships and two more Scottish Cups, including a double in 1906–07. He scored one of his team's three goals in the 1907 Scottish Cup Final; however, a new younger signing, Jimmy Weir, then took over as first-choice at left back.

Orr made three appearances for Scotland between 1900 and 1904. Although his usual playing position at Celtic was in defence, he had been a half-back early in his career, and it was in this role that he received all his international caps.

== Managerial career ==
Orr began his career as manager where he also began his playing career, at Airdrieonians in 1921. His leadership qualities showing again, Airdrie surprised many by finishing runners-up in Scotland in his second season, the club's highest-ever league finish and a placement he would achieve for each of the following four seasons, narrowly missing out on the title each time. He also led Airdrie to the club's only ever major honour, the Scottish Cup in 1924. In May 1926 his team took on Leith Athletic in a benefit match for his nephew Johnny Orr, who had played for Blackburn Rovers in the 1910s.

His success at Airdrie prompted the interest of English side Leicester City to replace the outgoing Peter Hodge. Orr continued Hodge's passing style and in only the club's third ever season in the top flight finished in a respectable 7th position, at that point the club's highest ever finish. The side only continued to improve under Orr and the following season in 1927–28 the club finished third in the league and the following season again, they finished runners-up, losing the title to The Wednesday by a single point. Leicester began to decline after the loss of inspirational captain Johnny Duncan, who was deemed to have terminated his own contract after breaking the club rules in taking over the licence of a local public house. and in January 1932 he resigned on the back of six straight league defeats.

Orr soon took the hot seat at Falkirk, but was banned for life in 1935 by the Scottish Football Association for a bribery scandal. Although the ban was lifted in 1937, Orr never returned to football.

== Honours ==
=== As a player ===
Celtic

- Division One: 1897–98, 1904–05, 1905–06, 1906–07
- Scottish Cup: 1900, 1904, 1907
- Glasgow Cup: 1904, 1905, 1906
- British League Cup: 1902

=== As a manager ===
Airdrieonians

- Scottish Cup: 1924
- Scottish Football League Runners-up: 1922–23, 1923–24, 1924–25, 1925–26

Leicester City

- Football League First Division Runners-up: 1928–29
