= Johnny Duncan (footballer) =

Scottish footballer and manager

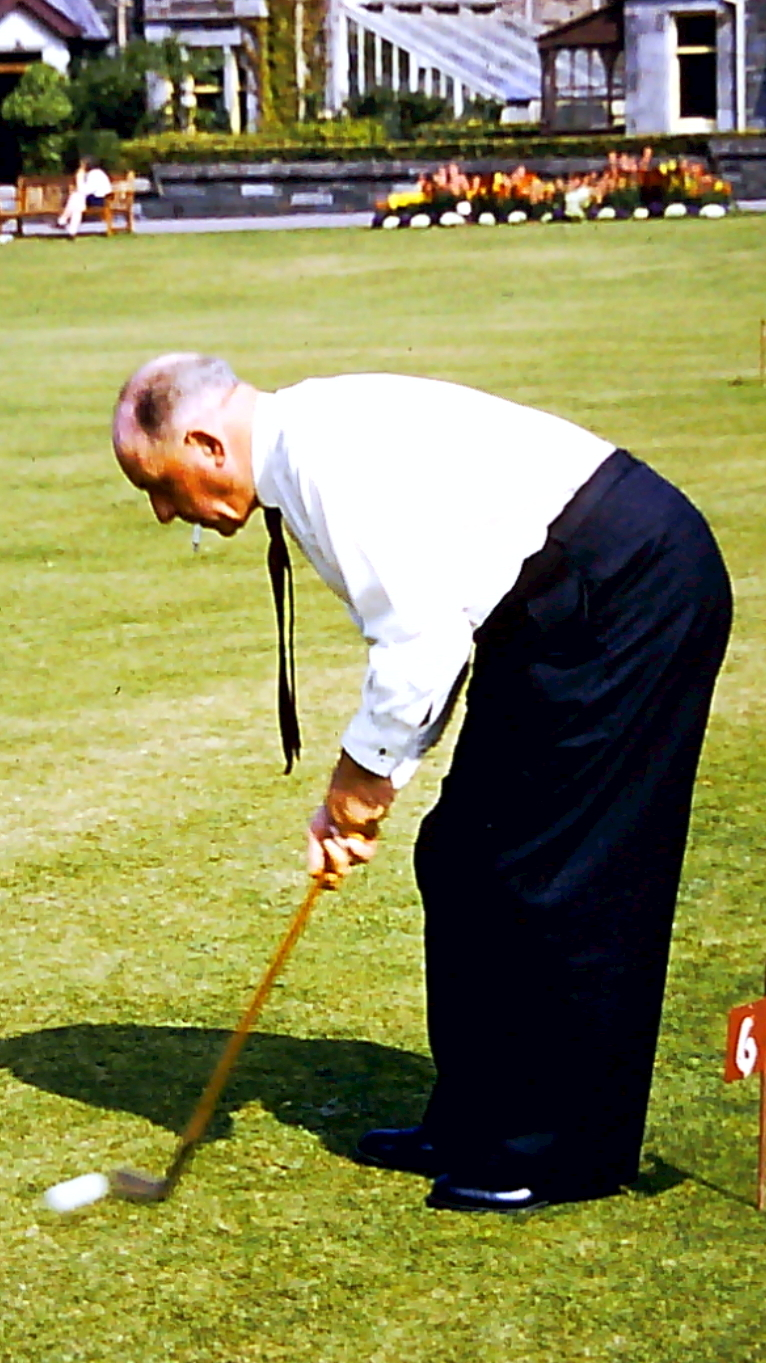
- Duncan playing golf as an elderly man

Personal information
- Date of birth: 14 February 1896
- Place of birth: Fife, Scotland
- Date of death: 14 March 1966 (aged 70)
- Place of death: Leicester, England
- Height: 5 ft 7 in (1.70 m)
- Positions: Right-half; inside right

Senior career*
Years	Team	Apps	(Gls)
1915–1919	Lochgelly United		
1919–1922	Raith Rovers	121	(26)
1922–1930	Leicester City	279	(88)
1933	Solus		

International career
1925	Scotland	1	(1)

Managerial career
- 1946–1949: Leicester City
- * Club domestic league appearances and goals

John Duncan (14 February 1896 – 14 March 1966), nicknamed "Tokey", was a Scottish football player and manager, who is most notable for his time at Leicester City.

He captained the club to its greatest ever league finishes of third and second place in the First Division in 1927–28 and 1928–29 respectively. While also carrying much of the backroom influence at the time as he asserted the club remained faithful to Peter Hodge's passing style. He later managed the club to its first ever major cup final in 1949. He has been described as "an indelible Leicester City great"

He also holds the (joint) club record at Leicester for the most goals in a single game, scoring six goals in a 7–0 victory over Port Vale on Christmas Day 1924 (this record was later equalled by Arthur Chandler, who scored the opening goal before Duncan hit his six against Port Vale).

Former Leeds United and England manager Don Revie, who played under Duncan at Leicester, dedicates an entire chapter of his autobiography to Duncan, entitled "My Debt to Johnny Duncan" claiming "Until you have heard Johnny Duncan talk about Soccer then your Football Education is sadly lacking."

== Early career ==
He started his senior football career with Lochgelly United in the wartime Eastern League during World War I, scoring a hat-trick against Dunfermline Athletic on his debut. After four years he moved on to Raith Rovers where he was almost ever-present over three seasons including 1921–22 when the Kirkcaldy club achieved their highest-ever Scottish Football League finish of third under manager Peter Hodge; towards the end of his career at Raith, he played alongside the legendary inside-forward Alex James.

== Leicester City ==
Duncan was soon re-united with Peter Hodge who signed him, along with his brother Tom, for Leicester City in 1922; he was considered the lynch-pin around which Hodge's plans in progressing the club and instilling the Scottish passing style into the club's culture were built. After Hodge left in 1926, Duncan insisted the club stayed loyal to Hodge's passing style as the club reached its halcyon years of league success.

Duncan's influence on the side was described by a column in The Sunday Express at the end of the 1928–29 season: "The best football team have been Leicester City, who have approached nearer to the pre-war standard than any other in individuality and constructive cleverness. I attribute this largely to the influence of their Scottish captain, John Duncan, who has insisted that the way to success was by expert use of the ball than by helter-skelter methods."

Duncan was effectively sacked as a player from the club in 1930 after the club refused to allow him to run a local public house, the "Turks' Head," while contracted as a player. He ran the Turks' Head with his wife Agnes until he died in 1966. It became known as one of the 'sportsmen pubs' of Leicester. He had three children Jean, David and Jenny.

He also won one cap for the Scotland national football team, scoring against Wales in the 1926 British Home Championship. He later had a brief spell at Leicester based amateur side Solus FC.

His influence as club captain was later transferred to management as he re-joined Leicester City once more, this time as manager after the end of World War II. He managed the club to their first ever major cup final, the 1949 FA Cup Final, which they lost to Wolverhampton Wanderers. The run to the cup final included an incredible 5–5 draw with Luton Town in the 5th round, in which Jack Lee managed to head home a Mal Griffiths corner in injury time of extra-time (this was Lee's fourth goal of the match) to equalise and send the game to a replay. Duncan missed the goal as he was on his knees with his back to the pitch, praying in desperation.

He was sacked a few months later in October 1949 after another disagreement with the club's board, this time over transfer policy, specifically over a dispute in which he stated that he didn't believe in close season deals, as he couldn't judge a player's current form.

He signed forward Don Revie for Leicester. Revie went on to marry his niece Elsie and eventually became one of the biggest names in English football as manager of Leeds United and then the England team.

Duncan continued to run the Turk's Head pub in Leicester for several decades after his playing career ended, including while still as manager.

== Personal life ==
John's nephew Alexander was also a footballer and would represent the United States at the first FIFA World Cup in Montevideo. Alexander would follow in his uncle's footsteps when he joined Leicester City in 1933.

== Honours ==
=== As a Player ===
Leicester City

- Football League First Division Runner-up: 1928–29
- Football League Second Division Champions: 1924–25

Scotland

- British Home Championship Winner: 1926

=== As a Manager ===
Leicester City

- FA Cup runner-up 1949
