= Ernie Hine =

English footballer

Personal information
- Full name: Ernest William Hine
- Date of birth: 9 April 1901
- Place of birth: Barnsley, England
- Date of death: 15 April 1974 (aged 73)
- Place of death: Huddersfield, England
- Height: 5 ft 9 in (1.75 m)
- Position: Inside right

Youth career
- New Mills
- Staincross Station

Senior career*
| Years | Team | Apps | (Gls) |
| 1921–1926 | Barnsley | 161 | (81) |
| 1926–1932 | Leicester City | 247 | (148) |
| 1932–1933 | Huddersfield Town | 23 | (4) |
| 1933–1934 | Manchester United | 51 | (12) |
| 1934–1938 | Barnsley | 127 | (42) |
| Total | | 609 | (287) |

International career
| 1926–1932 | England | 6 | (4) |
| 1931 | The Football League XI (Canadian Tour) | 11 | (20) |
- * Club domestic league appearances and goals

Ernest William Hine (9 April 1901 – 15 April 1974) was a professional footballer who played for Barnsley, Leicester City, Huddersfield Town and Manchester United.

He is the top goalscorer in the history of Barnsley with 130 goals and the third top goalscorer in the history of Leicester City scoring 156 times. He is the 18th top goalscorer in the history of English league football overall, netting 287 league goals in total.

== Career ==
=== Club career ===
Hine began his career with Barnsley in 1921 scoring on his debut in an FA Cup replay against Norwich. He helped Barnsley to third in the Second Division in 1921–22.

He was signed by Peter Hodge to newly promoted First Division side Leicester City in January 1926 for £3,000. He made an instant impact, scoring twice on his debut against Burnley, though he also missed a penalty. During his six and a half seasons with the East Midlands' club he forged a legendary forward line with Arthur Chandler and Arthur Lochhead, helping Leicester to its then-highest league finish as First Division runners-up in 1928–29.

Following spells with Huddersfield Town and Manchester United, he rejoined Barnsley in 1934, where he broke the club's all-time scoring record. After retiring at the end of the 1937–38 season, Barnsley appointed him as a coach in May 1939.

== International career ==
During his time at Leicester, Hine played for England on six occasions, making his debut against Ireland on 22 October 1928. He scored four times for England, his first coming against Wales on 17 November 1928.

=== International goals ===
Scores and results list England's goal tally first.

| # | Date | Venue | Opponent | Score | Result | Competition |
|---|---|---|---|---|---|---|
| 1 | 17 November 1928 | Vetch Field, Swansea | Wales | 3–2 | 3–2 | 1929 British Home Championship |
| 2 | 19 October 1929 | Windsor Park, Belfast | Ireland | 3–0 | 3–0 | 1930 British Home Championship |
| 3 | 17 October 1931 | Windsor Park, Belfast | Ireland | 3–1 | 6–2 | 1932 British Home Championship |
| 4 | 18 November 1931 | Anfield, Liverpool | Wales | 3–1 | 3–1 | 1932 British Home Championship |

== Honours ==
=== International ===
England

- British Home Championship: 1930, 1932
