= 1924–25 in English football =

Football in England
- Season: 1924–25

Men's football
- Football League: Huddersfield Town
- Football League Second Division: Leicester City
- FA Cup: Sheffield United

The 1924–25 season was the 50th season of competitive football in England.

== Honours ==
Competition	Winner	Runner-up
First Division	Huddersfield Town (2)	West Bromwich Albion
Second Division	Leicester City	Manchester United
Third Division North	Darlington	Nelson
Third Division South	Swansea Town	Plymouth Argyle
FA Cup	Sheffield United (4)	Cardiff City
Charity Shield	Professionals XI	Amateurs XI
Home Championship	Scotland	England

Notes = Number in parentheses is the times that club has won that honour. * indicates new record for competition

== Football League ==
=== First Division ===
Pos	Team	Pld	W	D	L	GF	GA	GAv	Pts	Relegation
1	Huddersfield Town (C)	42	21	16	5	69	28	2.464	58	
2	West Bromwich Albion	42	23	10	9	58	34	1.706	56	
3	Bolton Wanderers	42	22	11	9	76	34	2.235	55	
4	Liverpool	42	20	10	12	63	55	1.145	50	
5	Bury	42	17	15	10	54	51	1.059	49	
6	Newcastle United	42	16	16	10	61	42	1.452	48	
7	Sunderland	42	19	10	13	64	51	1.255	48	
8	Birmingham	42	17	12	13	49	53	0.925	46	
9	Notts County	42	16	13	13	42	31	1.355	45	
10	Manchester City	42	17	9	16	76	68	1.118	43	
11	Cardiff City	42	16	11	15	56	51	1.098	43	
12	Tottenham Hotspur	42	15	12	15	52	43	1.209	42	
13	West Ham United	42	15	12	15	62	60	1.033	42	
14	Sheffield United	42	13	13	16	55	63	0.873	39	
15	Aston Villa	42	13	13	16	58	71	0.817	39	
16	Blackburn Rovers	42	11	13	18	53	66	0.803	35	
17	Everton	42	12	11	19	40	60	0.667	35	
18	Leeds United	42	11	12	19	46	59	0.780	34	
19	Burnley	42	11	12	19	46	75	0.613	34	
20	Arsenal	42	14	5	23	46	58	0.793	33	
21	Preston North End (R)	42	10	6	26	37	74	0.500	26	Relegation to the Second Division
22	Nottingham Forest (R)	42	6	12	24	29	65	0.446	24	Relegation to the Second Division

Source: World Football
Rules for classification: 1) Points; 2) Goal average; 3) Goals scored
(C) Champions; (R) Relegated

=== Second Division ===
Pos	Team	Pld	W	D	L	GF	GA	GAv	Pts	Promotion or relegation
1	Leicester City (C, P)	42	24	11	7	90	32	2.813	59	Promotion to the First Division
2	Manchester United (P)	42	23	11	8	57	23	2.478	57	Promotion to the First Division
3	Derby County	42	22	11	9	71	36	1.972	55	
4	Portsmouth	42	15	18	9	58	50	1.160	48	
5	Chelsea	42	16	15	11	51	37	1.378	47	
6	Wolverhampton Wanderers	42	20	6	16	55	51	1.078	46	
7	Southampton	42	13	18	11	40	36	1.111	44	
8	Port Vale	42	17	8	17	48	56	0.857	42	
9	South Shields	42	12	17	13	42	38	1.105	41	
10	Hull City	42	15	11	16	50	49	1.020	41	
11	Clapton Orient	42	14	12	16	42	42	1.000	40	
12	Fulham	42	15	10	17	41	56	0.732	40	
13	Middlesbrough	42	10	19	13	36	44	0.818	39	
14	The Wednesday	42	15	8	19	50	56	0.893	38	
15	Barnsley	42	13	12	17	46	59	0.780	38	
16	Bradford City	42	13	12	17	37	50	0.740	38	
17	Blackpool	42	14	9	19	65	61	1.066	37	
18	Oldham Athletic	42	13	11	18	35	51	0.686	37	
19	Stockport County	42	13	11	18	37	57	0.649	37	
20	Stoke	42	12	11	19	34	46	0.739	35	
21	Crystal Palace (R)	42	12	10	20	38	54	0.704	34	Relegation to the Third Division South
22	Coventry City (R)	42	11	9	22	45	84	0.536	31	Relegation to the Third Division North

(C) Champions; (P) Promoted; (R) Relegated

=== Third Division North ===
Pos	Team	Pld	W	D	L	GF	GA	GAv	Pts	Qualification
1	Darlington (C, P)	42	24	10	8	78	33	2.364	58	Promotion to the Second Division
2	Nelson	42	23	7	12	79	50	1.580	53	
3	New Brighton	42	23	7	12	75	50	1.500	53	
4	Southport	42	22	7	13	59	37	1.595	51	
5	Bradford (Park Avenue)	42	19	12	11	84	42	2.000	50	
6	Rochdale	42	21	7	14	75	53	1.415	49	
7	Chesterfield	42	17	11	14	60	44	1.364	45	
8	Lincoln City	42	18	8	16	53	58	0.914	44	
9	Halifax Town	42	16	11	15	56	52	1.077	43	
10	Ashington	42	16	10	16	68	76	0.895	42	
11	Wigan Borough	42	15	11	16	62	65	0.954	41	
12	Grimsby Town	42	15	9	18	60	60	1.000	39	
13	Durham City	42	13	13	16	50	68	0.735	39	
14	Barrow	42	16	7	19	51	74	0.689	39	
15	Crewe Alexandra	42	13	13	16	53	78	0.679	39	
16	Wrexham	42	15	8	19	53	61	0.869	38	
17	Accrington Stanley	42	15	8	19	60	72	0.833	38	
18	Doncaster Rovers	42	14	10	18	54	65	0.831	38	
19	Walsall	42	13	11	18	44	53	0.830	37	
20	Hartlepools United	42	12	11	19	45	63	0.714	35	
21	Tranmere Rovers	42	14	4	24	59	78	0.756	32	Re-elected
22	Rotherham County	42	7	7	28	42	88	0.477	21	Re-elected as Rotherham United

Source: rsssf.com
(C) Champions; (P) Promoted

=== Third Division South ===
Pos	Team	Pld	W	D	L	GF	GA	GAv	Pts	Qualification
1	Swansea Town (C, P)	42	23	11	8	68	35	1.943	57	Promotion to the Second Division
2	Plymouth Argyle	42	23	10	9	77	38	2.026	56	
3	Bristol City	42	22	9	11	60	41	1.463	53	
4	Swindon Town	42	20	11	11	66	38	1.737	51	
5	Millwall	42	18	13	11	58	38	1.526	49	
6	Newport County	42	20	9	13	62	42	1.476	49	
7	Exeter City	42	19	9	14	59	48	1.229	47	
8	Brighton & Hove Albion	42	19	8	15	59	45	1.311	46	
9	Northampton Town	42	20	6	16	51	44	1.159	46	
10	Southend United	42	19	5	18	51	61	0.836	43	
11	Watford	42	17	9	16	38	47	0.809	43	
12	Norwich City	42	14	13	15	53	51	1.039	41	
13	Gillingham	42	13	14	15	35	44	0.795	40	
14	Reading	42	14	10	18	37	38	0.974	38	
15	Charlton Athletic	42	13	12	17	46	48	0.958	38	
16	Luton Town	42	10	17	15	49	57	0.860	37	
17	Bristol Rovers	42	12	13	17	42	49	0.857	37	
18	Aberdare Athletic	42	14	9	19	54	67	0.806	37	
19	Queens Park Rangers	42	14	8	20	42	63	0.667	36	
20	Bournemouth & Boscombe Athletic	42	13	8	21	40	58	0.690	34	
21	Brentford	42	9	7	26	38	91	0.418	25	Re-elected
22	Merthyr Town	42	8	5	29	35	77	0.455	21	Re-elected

(C) Champions; (P) Promoted

=== Top goalscorers ===
First Division

- Frank Roberts (Manchester City) – 31 goals

Second Division

- Arthur Chandler (Leicester City) – 33 goals

Third Division North

- David Brown (Darlington) – 39 goals

Third Division South

- Jack Fowler (Swansea Town) – 28 goals
