= List of Scarborough F.C. seasons =

The Scarborough team of the 1885–86 season

Scarborough Football Club started competing in English football from 1887, when the club first competed in the FA Cup, to 2007, when it was liquidated. This list details the club's achievements in all major competitions, and the top scorers for each season.

The club was formed in 1879 and during the early 1880s the club participated in the Scarborough & East Riding County Cup, but took no part in any league. They went on to compete in the Cleveland Amateur League but left after one season, gaining admission to play in the Northern League Second Division for the 1898–99 season. They played in the Yorkshire Combination from 1910 to 1914, but were made to return to the Northern League after the league collapsed. After turning professional, the club competed in the Yorkshire League but after one season there they joined the Midland League, which fielded stronger teams.

Scarborough competed in the Midland League for 26 seasons, which were disrupted by a seven-year absence from 1939 to 1946 due to the Second World War. In 1960 they joined the Northern Counties League. After two seasons, they joined the re-formed North Eastern League for the 1962–63 season, which Scarborough finished as champions. Following this season, Scarborough rejoined the Midland League for five seasons before becoming founder members of the Northern Premier League. The 1972–73 season saw Scarborough finish as runners-up in the league and as winners of the FA Trophy, a competition which the club won on a further two occasions, in 1976 and 1977.

The club became founder members of the Alliance Premier League in 1979, and were the division's champions for the 1986–87 season, when it was renamed the Football Conference. This ensured the club's entry to the Football League Fourth Division as the first non-league team to gain automatic promotion to The Football League. In their second season in the Fourth Division Scarborough reached the play-offs, where they were beaten by Leyton Orient 2–1 on aggregate. The play-offs were again reached in 1998, but a 7–2 aggregate defeat by Torquay United meant elimination in the semi-final. The following season the club finished bottom of the Football League, and endured relegation to the Conference. They played there until falling to the Conference North for the 2006–07 season. This was Scarborough's final season, as they folded in June 2007.

== Key ==
| Champions | Runners-up | Promoted | Relegated |

Division shown in bold when it changes due to promotion, relegation or league reorganisation. Top scorer shown in bold when he set or equalled a club record.

- P = Played
- W = Games won
- D = Games drawn
- L = Games lost
- F = Goals for
- A = Goals against
- Pts = Points
- Pos = Final position
- All Prem = Alliance Premier League
- Conf = Football Conference
- Conf Nat = Conference National
- Conf Nor = Conference North
- Div 3 = Football League Third Division
- Div 4 = Football League Fourth Division
- Mid = Midland Football League
- NCL = Northern Counties League
- NE = North Eastern League
- North = Northern League
- North 2 = Northern League Division Two
- NPL = Northern Premier League
- Yorks Comb = Yorkshire Combination
- Yorks Lge = Yorkshire League
- PR = Preliminary round
- QR1 = Qualifying round 1
- QR2 = Qualifying round 2
- QR3 = Qualifying round 3
- QR4 = Qualifying round 4
- R1 = Round 1
- R2 = Round 2
- R3 = Round 3
- R4 = Round 4
- QF = Quarter-finals
- N = Northern sector
- Grp = Group stage

== Seasons ==
| Season | League | | | | | | | | | FA Cup | League Cup | Other competitions | | Top scorer | |
| Season | Division | P | W | D | L | F | A | Pts | Pos | FA Cup | League Cup | Other competitions | | Top scorer | |
|---|---|---|---|---|---|---|---|---|---|---|---|---|---|---|---|
| 1887–88 | Scarborough did not compete in league football until 1898. | | | | | | | | | R1 | | | | | |
| 1888–89 | Scarborough did not compete in league football until 1898. | | | | | | | | | QR2 | | | | | |
| 1889–90 | Scarborough did not compete in league football until 1898. | | | | | | | | | QR1 | | | | | |
| 1890–91 | Scarborough did not compete in league football until 1898. | | | | | | | | | QR1 | | | | | |
| 1891–92 | Scarborough did not compete in league football until 1898. | | | | | | | | | QR2 | | | | | |
| 1892–93 | Scarborough did not compete in league football until 1898. | | | | | | | | | | | | | | |
| 1893–94 | Scarborough did not compete in league football until 1898. | | | | | | | | | | | FA Amateur Cup | QR2 | | |
| 1894–95 | Scarborough did not compete in league football until 1898. | | | | | | | | | | | | | | |
| 1895–96 | Scarborough did not compete in league football until 1898. | | | | | | | | | | | | | | |
| 1896–97 | Scarborough did not compete in league football until 1898. | | | | | | | | | | | | | | |
| 1897–98 | Scarborough did not compete in league football until 1898. | | | | | | | | | | | FA Amateur Cup | QR3 | | |
| 1898–99 | North 2 | 16 | 5 | 1 | 10 | 21 | 37 | 11 | 8th | | | FA Amateur Cup | QR3 | | |
| 1899–1900 | North 2 | 14 | 4 | 3 | 7 | 27 | 34 | 11 | 6th | | | FA Amateur Cup | QR3 | F Jefferson | 11 |
| 1900–01 | North | 20 | 9 | 3 | 8 | 25 | 28 | 21 | 6th | | | FA Amateur Cup | R1 | Lionel Charlwood | 9 |
| 1901–02 | North | 18 | 5 | 3 | 10 | 20 | 35 | 13 | 9th | PR | | FA Amateur Cup | R1 | Alf Duke | 10 |
| 1902–03 | North | 24 | 5 | 4 | 15 | 23 | 69 | 14 | 11th | QR1 | | FA Amateur Cup | R1 | Allan | 8 |
| 1903–04 | North | 24 | 7 | 2 | 15 | 36 | 70 | 16 | 11th | QR2 | | FA Amateur Cup | R2 | Billy Todd | 21 |
| 1904–05 | North | 24 | 4 | 5 | 15 | 22 | 60 | 13 | 12th | QR1 | | FA Amateur Cup | QR2 | Sims | 7 |
| 1905–06 | North | 26 | 7 | 2 | 17 | 24 | 93 | 16 | 13th | | | FA Amateur Cup | R2 | Renwick | 11 |
| 1906–07 | North | 22 | 7 | 1 | 14 | 34 | 50 | 15 | 12th | | | FA Amateur Cup | QR3 | George Blades | 14 |
| 1907–08 | North | 22 | 5 | 0 | 17 | 44 | 70 | 10 | 12th | QR1 | | FA Amateur Cup | QR4 | Ocky Johnson | 31 |
| 1908–09 | North | 22 | 9 | 1 | 12 | 45 | 56 | 19 | 8th | QR1 | | FA Amateur Cup | R1 | Ocky Johnson | 31 |
| 1909–10 | North | 22 | 8 | 4 | 10 | 43 | 49 | 20 | 7th | PR | | FA Amateur Cup | R3 | Ocky Johnson | 20 |
| 1910–11 | Yorks Comb | 18 | 12 | 1 | 5 | 53 | 36 | 25 | 2nd | QR1 | | FA Amateur Cup | R2 | Ocky Johnson | 24 |
| 1911–12 | Yorks Comb | 28 | 16 | 4 | 6 | 69 | 46 | 36 | 4th | QR1 | | FA Amateur Cup | R2 | Ocky Johnson | 25 |
| 1912–13 | Yorks Comb | 24 | 10 | 4 | 10 | 57 | 51 | 24 | 6th | QR2 | | FA Amateur Cup | R1 | Ocky Johnson | 15 |
| 1913–14 | Yorks Comb | 18 | 8 | 1 | 9 | 41 | 42 | 17 | 5th | PR | | FA Amateur Cup | QR2 | Ocky Johnson | 20 |
| 1914–15 | North | 16 | 6 | 1 | 9 | 23 | 49 | 13 | 7th | PR | | FA Amateur Cup | R1 | W Renwick | 7 |
League football and FA Cup were suspended until after the First World War.
| 1919–20 | North | 26 | 5 | 3 | 18 | 30 | 94 | 13 | 14th | PR | | FA Amateur Cup | R2 | Ocky Johnson | 15 |
| 1920–21 | North | 26 | 4 | 3 | 19 | 28 | 60 | 11 | 14th | QR2 | | FA Amateur Cup | R2 | Ocky Johnson | 22 |
| 1921–22 | North | 26 | 4 | 8 | 14 | 39 | 71 | 16 | 12th | QR2 | | FA Amateur Cup | QR3 | Spaven | 14 |
| 1922–23 | North | 26 | 10 | 1 | 15 | 51 | 52 | 21 | 12th | QR1 | | FA Amateur Cup | QR3 | Ocky Johnson | 19 |
| 1923–24 | North | 28 | 8 | 9 | 11 | 55 | 55 | 25 | 10th | QR1 | | FA Amateur Cup | QR2 | A Coulson | 20 |
| 1924–25 | North | 28 | 11 | 2 | 15 | 50 | 45 | 24 | 10th | PR | | FA Amateur Cup | QR2 | A Coulson | 14 |
| 1925–26 | North | 26 | 10 | 2 | 14 | 53 | 72 | 22 | 11th | QR4 | | FA Amateur Cup | R3 | Wade | 18 |
| 1926–27 | Yorks Lge | 30 | 10 | 7 | 13 | 74 | 69 | 27 | 10th | | | | | Ellis | 20 |
| 1927–28 | Mid | 44 | 26 | 7 | 11 | 108 | 61 | 59 | 2nd | QR2 | | | | Harry Lovatt | 40 |
| 1928–29 | Mid | 50 | 25 | 8 | 17 | 115 | 91 | 58 | 7th | R2 | | | | Billy Clayson | 46 |
| 1929–30 | Mid | 50 | 36 | 9 | 5 | 143 | 44 | 81 | 1st | QR4 | | | | Billy Clayson | 48 |
| 1930–31 | Mid | 46 | 16 | 9 | 21 | 93 | 110 | 41 | 16th | R3 | | | | Jack Rand | 24 |
| 1931–32 | Mid | 46 | 22 | 7 | 17 | 81 | 83 | 51 | 6th | QR4 | | | | Fred Wallbanks | 34 |
| 1932–33 | Mid | 44 | 25 | 9 | 10 | 137 | 81 | 59 | 5th | R2 | | | | Billy Clayson | 58 |
| 1933–34 | Mid | 32 | 12 | 8 | 12 | 57 | 67 | 32 | 8th | R1 | | | | Walter Camidge; John Nock | 24 |
| 1934–35 | Mid | 38 | 2 | 11 | 25 | 32 | 113 | 15 | 20th | | | | | Billy Clayson | 12 |
| 1935–36 | Mid | 40 | 15 | 9 | 16 | 61 | 70 | 39 | 13th | R2 | | | | Albert Smithson | 53 |
| 1936–37 | Mid | 42 | 10 | 6 | 26 | 55 | 99 | 26 | 21st | | | | | William Varty | 27 |
| 1937–38 | Mid | 42 | 23 | 7 | 12 | 70 | 46 | 53 | 3rd | R3 | | | | Alf Agar | 24 |
| 1938–39 | Mid | 42 | 18 | 10 | 14 | 79 | 81 | 46 | 9th | R1 | | | | Alf Agar | 18 |
No competitive football was played between 1939 and 1946 due to the Second World War.
| 1945–46 | n/a | | | | | | | | | QR4 | | | | | |
| 1946–47 | Mid | 42 | 15 | 9 | 18 | 73 | 83 | 39 | 14th | QR4 | | | | Peter Cook | 13 |
| 1947–48 | Mid | 42 | 12 | 9 | 21 | 67 | 85 | 33 | 17th | QR4 | | | | Peter Cook | 14 |
| 1948–49 | Mid | 42 | 11 | 9 | 22 | 49 | 90 | 31 | 19th | R2 | | | | Peter Cook | 22 |
| 1949–50 | Mid | 46 | 18 | 8 | 20 | 106 | 96 | 44 | 14th | QR4 | | | | George Murphy | 31 |
| 1950–51 | Mid | 42 | 14 | 14 | 14 | 70 | 70 | 42 | 11th | R1 | | | | Roy Cooling | 17 |
| 1951–52 | Mid | 42 | 19 | 10 | 13 | 92 | 76 | 48 | 6th | QR4 | | | | Geoff Redhead | 21 |
| 1952–53 | Mid | 46 | 14 | 7 | 25 | 74 | 108 | 35 | 20th | R1 | | | | Geoff Redhead | 14 |
| 1953–54 | Mid | 46 | 14 | 10 | 22 | 80 | 97 | 38 | 19th | R1 | | | | Ellis Stafford | 23 |
| 1954–55 | Mid | 46 | 12 | 8 | 26 | 62 | 122 | 32 | 22nd | R1 | | | | Geoff Redhead | 13 |
| 1955–56 | Mid | 46 | 13 | 10 | 23 | 90 | 113 | 36 | 18th | R1 | | | | Alan Parkinson | 38 |
| 1956–57 | Mid | 46 | 13 | 7 | 26 | 86 | 128 | 33 | 23rd | R1 | | | | Alan Parkinson | 29 |
| 1957–58 | Mid | 46 | 20 | 10 | 16 | 80 | 70 | 50 | 7th | R1 | | | | Jim Scarborough | 19 |
| 1958–59 | Mid | 36 | 13 | 9 | 14 | 63 | 79 | 35 | 9th | QR4 | | | | Ernie Whittle | 13 |
| 1959–60 | Mid | 32 | 9 | 8 | 15 | 48 | 65 | 26 | 13th | R1 | | | | Ernie Whittle | 14 |
| 1960–61 | NCL | 18 | 9 | 1 | 8 | 32 | 30 | 19 | 5th | R1 | | | | John Powell | 15 |
| 1961–62 | NCL | 24 | 11 | 5 | 8 | 48 | 31 | 27 | 6th | QR4 | | | | Eddy Brown | 16 |
| 1962–63 | NE | 22 | 14 | 4 | 4 | 71 | 34 | 32 | 1st | R1 | | | | Cliff Jones | 24 |
| 1963–64 | Mid | 42 | 26 | 11 | 5 | 107 | 45 | 63 | 2nd | QR3 | | | | Alan Franks; John Powell | 25 |
| 1964–65 | Mid | 42 | 22 | 10 | 10 | 116 | 67 | 54 | 5th | R2 | | | | Johnny Edgar | 26 |
| 1965–66 | Mid | 42 | 19 | 7 | 16 | 89 | 80 | 45 | 11th | R1 | | | | Alan Franks | 25 |
| 1966–67 | Mid | 42 | 22 | 7 | 13 | 89 | 59 | 51 | 6th | QR1 | | | | Alan Franks | 29 |
| 1967–68 | Mid | 40 | 21 | 4 | 15 | 67 | 52 | 46 | 7th | QR1 | | | | Keith Adamson | 24 |
| 1968–69 | NPL | 38 | 9 | 10 | 19 | 49 | 68 | 28 | 17th | QR2 | | | | Alan Wilcockson | 15 |
| 1969–70 | NPL | 38 | 20 | 10 | 8 | 74 | 39 | 50 | 4th | QR4 | | FA Trophy | R2 | Alan Franks | 36 |
| 1970–71 | NPL | 42 | 23 | 12 | 7 | 83 | 40 | 58 | 3rd | R1 | | FA Trophy | R2 | Jeff Barmby | 29 |
| 1971–72 | NPL | 46 | 21 | 15 | 10 | 75 | 46 | 57 | 4th | R1 | | FA Trophy | R2 | Malcolm Thompson | 31 |
| 1972–73 | NPL | 46 | 26 | 9 | 11 | 72 | 39 | 61 | 2nd | R2 | | FA Trophy | W | Malcolm Leask | 25 |
| 1973–74 | NPL | 46 | 22 | 14 | 10 | 62 | 43 | 58 | 5th | R2 | | FA Trophy | R2 | Jeff Barmby; Malcolm Leask | 15 |
| 1974–75 | NPL | 46 | 24 | 12 | 10 | 75 | 45 | 60 | 5th | QR4 | | FA Trophy | RU | Jeff Barmby | 31 |
| 1975–76 | NPL | 46 | 26 | 10 | 10 | 84 | 43 | 62 | 3rd | R3 | | FA Trophy | W | John Woodall | 30 |
| 1976–77 | NPL | 44 | 21 | 12 | 11 | 77 | 66 | 54 | 5th | R1 | | Anglo-Italian Cup | R4 | John Woodall | 24 |
| 1976–77 | NPL | 44 | 21 | 12 | 11 | 77 | 66 | 54 | 5th | R1 | | FA Trophy | W | John Woodall | 24 |
| 1977–78 | NPL | 46 | 26 | 10 | 10 | 80 | 39 | 62 | 4th | R3 | | Anglo-Italian Cup | R4 | Dave Smith | 28 |
| 1977–78 | NPL | 46 | 26 | 10 | 10 | 80 | 39 | 62 | 4th | R3 | | FA Trophy | R1 | Dave Smith | 28 |
| 1978–79 | NPL | 44 | 19 | 14 | 11 | 61 | 44 | 52 | 4th | R2 | | FA Trophy | R2 | Derek Abbey | 15 |
| 1979–80 | All Prem | 38 | 12 | 15 | 11 | 47 | 38 | 39 | 11th | R1 | | FA Trophy | R1 | Bob Gauden | 17 |
| 1980–81 | All Prem | 38 | 17 | 13 | 8 | 49 | 29 | 47 | 3rd | R1 | | FA Trophy | R1 | Bob Gauden | 16 |
| 1981–82 | All Prem | 42 | 19 | 11 | 12 | 65 | 52 | 68 | 7th | QR4 | | FA Trophy | QF | Colin Williams | 33 |
| 1982–83 | All Prem | 42 | 17 | 12 | 13 | 71 | 58 | 63 | 9th | R1 | | FA Trophy | R3 | John Hanson | 21 |
| 1983–84 | All Prem | 42 | 14 | 16 | 12 | 52 | 55 | 48 | 13th | QR4 | | FA Trophy | R1 | John Hanson | 17 |
| 1984–85 | All Prem | 42 | 17 | 13 | 12 | 69 | 62 | 54 | 6th | QR4 | | FA Trophy | R2 | Marshall Burke | 14 |
| 1985–86 | All Prem | 42 | 13 | 11 | 18 | 54 | 66 | 40 | 15th | R1 | | FA Trophy | R2 | David Bowman | 10 |
| 1986–87 | Conf | 42 | 27 | 10 | 5 | 64 | 33 | 91 | 1st | QR1 | | FA Trophy | R3 | Stewart Mell | 18 |
| 1987–88 | Div 4 | 46 | 17 | 14 | 15 | 56 | 48 | 65 | 12th | R1 | R1 | Associate Members Cup | Grp | Stewart Mell | 10 |
| 1988–89 | Div 4 | 46 | 21 | 14 | 11 | 67 | 52 | 77 | 5th | R2 | R3 | Associate Members Cup | SFN | Gary Brook | 18 |
| 1989–90 | Div 4 | 46 | 15 | 10 | 21 | 60 | 73 | 55 | 18th | R1 | R3 | Associate Members Cup | Grp | Paul Dobson | 16 |
| 1990–91 | Div 4 | 46 | 19 | 12 | 15 | 59 | 56 | 69 | 9th | R1 | R1 | Associate Members Cup | Grp | George Oghani | 16 |
| 1991–92 | Div 4 | 42 | 15 | 12 | 15 | 64 | 68 | 57 | 12th | R1 | R2 | Associate Members Cup | R1N | Tommy Mooney | 11 |
| 1992–93 | Div 3 | 42 | 15 | 9 | 18 | 66 | 71 | 54 | 13th | R1 | R4 | Associate Members Cup | R2N | Darren Foreman | 31 |
| 1993–94 | Div 3 | 42 | 15 | 8 | 19 | 55 | 61 | 53 | 14th | R2 | R1 | Associate Members Cup | R2N | Craig Whitington; Stuart Young | 10 |
| 1994–95 | Div 3 | 42 | 8 | 10 | 24 | 49 | 70 | 34 | 21st | R3 | R2 | Associate Members Cup | R2N | Jason White | 12 |
| 1995–96 | Div 3 | 46 | 8 | 16 | 22 | 39 | 69 | 40 | 23rd | R1 | R1 | Associate Members Cup | Grp | Andy Ritchie | 8 |
| 1996–97 | Div 3 | 46 | 16 | 15 | 15 | 65 | 68 | 63 | 12th | R2 | R2 | Associate Members Cup | R1N | Andy Ritchie | 14 |
| 1997–98 | Div 3 | 46 | 19 | 15 | 12 | 67 | 58 | 72 | 6th | R1 | R1 | Associate Members Cup | R1N | Gareth Williams | 16 |
| 1998–99 | Div 3 | 46 | 14 | 6 | 26 | 50 | 77 | 48 | 24th | R1 | R1 | Associate Members Cup | R2N | Steve Brodie | 13 |
| 1999–2000 | Conf | 42 | 19 | 12 | 11 | 60 | 35 | 69 | 4th | QR4 | | FA Trophy | R5 | Steve Brodie | 16 |
| 2000–01 | Conf | 42 | 14 | 16 | 12 | 56 | 54 | 58 | 10th | QR4 | | Football League Trophy | R1N | David Pounder | 12 |
| 2000–01 | Conf | 42 | 14 | 16 | 12 | 56 | 54 | 58 | 10th | QR4 | | FA Trophy | R4 | David Pounder | 12 |
| 2001–02 | Conf | 42 | 14 | 14 | 14 | 55 | 63 | 55 | 12th | QR4 | | Football League Trophy | R1N | Darryn Stamp | 14 |
| 2001–02 | Conf | 42 | 14 | 14 | 14 | 55 | 63 | 55 | 12th | QR4 | | FA Trophy | R5 | Darryn Stamp | 14 |
| 2002–03 | Conf | 42 | 18 | 10 | 14 | 63 | 54 | 64 | 7th | R1 | | Football League Trophy | R1N | Keith Scott | 12 |
| 2002–03 | Conf | 42 | 18 | 10 | 14 | 63 | 54 | 64 | 7th | R1 | | FA Trophy | R4 | Keith Scott | 12 |
| 2003–04 | Conf | 42 | 12 | 15 | 15 | 51 | 54 | 51 | 15th | R4 | | Football League Trophy | R2N | Mark Quayle | 16 |
| 2003–04 | Conf | 42 | 12 | 15 | 15 | 51 | 54 | 51 | 15th | R4 | | FA Trophy | R3 | Mark Quayle | 16 |
| 2004–05 | Conf Nat | 42 | 14 | 14 | 14 | 60 | 46 | 56 | 13th | QR4 | | Football League Trophy | R1N | Neil Redfearn | 14 |
| 2004–05 | Conf Nat | 42 | 14 | 14 | 14 | 60 | 46 | 56 | 13th | QR4 | | FA Trophy | R3 | Neil Redfearn | 14 |
| 2005–06 | Conf Nat | 42 | 9 | 10 | 23 | 40 | 66 | 37 | 21st | QR4 | | FA Trophy | R1 | Michael Coulson | 7 |
| 2006–07 | Conf Nor | 42 | 13 | 16 | 13 | 50 | 45 | 45 | 20th | QR4 | | FA Trophy | R1 | Chris Thompson | 15 |
