= History of Scarborough F.C. =

History of an English football club

This article covers the history of the Scarborough Football Club from the 1870s to 1998.

== Foundation and early years ==
During the late 1870s, a group of young men from the town including cricketers wanted a game to play during the winter months and began meetings at North Marine Road cricket ground to discuss founding Scarborough Football Club. Lord Londesborough was a pivotal figure in getting the club off the ground and helped organise the first inter-club matches in October 1879. As a patron of the club he persuaded the local cricket club to allow the installation of experimental electric lights for two night football games. Due to the code preferences of the other teams from York and Hull, the rugby football code was played instead. The first ever line-up was:

- J. Kitchin (captain)
- W. Sanderson
- J. Kimmings
- C. Wheater

- H. Hare
- H. Vyvyan
- F. Rowntree
- J. Webb

- H. Vassalli
- R. Hodgson
- E. Hodgson
- A. Hodgson

- G. Harrison
- G. Frank
- A. Jones

Scarborough squad of 1885.

The first ever time the club played an association football match was on 6 November 1880 at the Cricket Ground against Bridlington. Scarborough won the game 2–1. During the early half of the 1880s the side played in the Scarborough & East Riding County Cup competition and the name of the club was changed to Scarborough Cricketers Football Club. Scarborough won their first trophy in 1885–86, lifting the County Cup; however it was a hollow victory as the final ended 4–4 against a team from Hull, but Hull refused to attend the replay and so Scarborough won by default. The following season Whitby beat them 3–2 in the final of the same competition. By the summer of 1887, the club had reverted to the name Scarborough Football Club and moved to their own ground in the form of the Recreation Ground.

That season in their new ground, in front of 5,000 locals, Scarborough avenged their County Cup final defeat the previous season, by beating Whitby 6–1 in the final of the same competition. During this period rivalry between the two clubs was intense. In the 1889 FA Cup Scarborough knocked Whitby out in the First Round, with Whitby complaining that Scarborough's ground was an illegal size. Scarborough lost in the Second Round and were knocked out, though they did win the County Cup that year again by beating Whitby in the final. Unfortunately the rivalry culminated in one of the first football riots: after a disagreement about a goal, Whitby players were attacked on the pitch by Scarborough fans and eventually chased out to the Scarborough railway station. Nineteen-year-old Whitby player Albert Drabble was attacked at the game and died the following month of a heart attack; although links between the incidents were not conclusive it put a large shadow over the fixture.

== Developments and the Northern League ==
The club began to develop, with more success in local Scarborough & East Riding County Cup competitions and the creation of a reserves team who would play in the newly created Scarborough League, though the first team continued to lose heavily in FA Cup games. Scarborough were invited to become one of the founding members of the Cleveland Amateur League, but they left after one season, because as soon as a visiting club was beaten at the Recreation Ground, they would complain to get the result overturned due to the pitch size. The club was also amongst the first to compete in the FA Amateur Cup. In the 1898–99 season Scarborough took a step up, by joining the Northern League Second Division, and the club also had a new ground built in the form of the Athletic Ground. A disagreement about the headquarters saw the club torn in two; half of the players and staff stayed and the other half broke off to found the Scarborough Utopians.

The Second Division of the Northern League was abolished in 1900; this saw Scarborough and two other clubs admitted to the single Northern League division. Around this era the league was strong, featuring the likes of Bishop Auckland, as well as reserves of Newcastle United, Sunderland and Middlesbrough. It was during the early 1900s that Ocky Johnson debuted, the most prolific goalscorer in the history of the club with at least 245 goals, he was one of Scarborough's all-time heroes. In 1906, Thomas Cole became chairman of the club and sought efforts to battle the club's debts; he would remain chairman until the mid-1920s. Scarborough won their first North Riding Senior Cup final in 1909, a competition which they would win many times; during the league in the early 1900s they were consistently mid-table finishers. Scarborough joined a new league in 1910–11 in the form of the Yorkshire Combination, a mixture of professional and amateur clubs from the county. Boro managed decent results in the league but after four years it collapsed due to lack of support from major clubs, leading Scarborough to return to the Northern League. The First World War interrupted any meaningful sporting activities; Boro players Tommy Renwick and Sam Horsman died during it. Scarborough were more fortunate than many clubs who were dissolved during this period, managing to survive throughout.

== After the First World War ==
Despite still having their star man Ocky Johnson, Scarborough had slipped in form during the post war period. The club suffered a humiliating and record defeat against Middlesbrough in 1919, losing 16–1 in total. Although financially the club were doing well, their finishing places in the league was not as rosy. Under the guidance of new chairman W.T. Medd the club adopted professionalism in 1926, joining the Yorkshire Football League, with their first ever professional match against Bridlington Town which they won 3–1. Spurred on by great home attendance figures, Scarborough left the Yorkshire League after just one season to join the stronger Midland Football League. With James McGraham as player-coach, Scarborough played attractive attacking football and managed to surprise most by finishing runners-up to Gainsborough Trinity at their first attempt. Local rivals Scarborough Penguins folded around this time and merged with Boro. Several players were signed by Football League clubs, but with goalscorer Billy Clayson leading the way, Scarborough were crowned champions of the Midland League in 1929–30.

The financial cost it took to build a squad capable of winning the league backfired, many had to be sold to Football League clubs as a result. Despite the drop in form in the Midlands League, Boro shined in the FA Cup reaching the Third Round; one of these fixtures was considered the greatest ever played at the Athletic Ground, where Scarborough came from behind to beat Football League side Lincoln City 6–4. A couple of years later, the transfer of club hero Billy Clayson to York City just a season after Scarborough had knocked the fellow Yorkshire club out of the FA Cup would light the fire of a rivalry between the two, essentially taking the place of the older rivalry with Whitby. After coming close to folding and disastrous league form, experienced former Manchester United man Thomas Boyle was brought in as player-manager and helped the club to improve drastically, with a decent FA Cup run in the year just after he left, where Boro reached the Third Round before going out to Luton Town after a replay. Boro's league form had improved also and they managed to finish 3rd in the Midland League during 1937–38 before again war interrupted again, in the form of the Second World War.

== After the Second World War ==
The club did survive the Second World War, however they missed the first season back in the Midland League because their ground had been used for military training during the war and was in very poor condition. Scarborough finally returned to the Midland League by 1946–47; Peter Cook was the star player in the first post-war years, finishing as the club's top scorer for three seasons in a row. The club suffered from having an unstable squad, with numerous different players turning out for the club in a short period of time, this showed in their league table finishes. Scarborough reserves were able to gain entry into the Yorkshire League during 1949. Boro almost dropped out of the Midland League due to a financial crisis, however a prestige friendly match against Hull City was organised to help the club, with famous players such as Don Revie and Raich Carter turning out for Hull. In 1951–52 the club managed to finish 6th in the league, with a strong squad including the likes of Bert Brenen, Bernard Massey and Jimmy Johnson. This was a brief success, before having to sell their best players on and falling back down the table.

Despite poor financial conditions in the mid-1950s and unimpressive league positions, the club did have flashes of quality, exemplified by Alan Parkinson who scored 67 league goals over the course of two seasons. The Midland League itself began to decline in prestige after a shake up for the 1958–59 season which saw the majority of the clubs leaving the league, many to the Southern League. Thanks to the Supporters Club, Scarborough had the Athletic Ground bought back in 1960 after a period of Scarborough Corporation owning it. The Midland League collapsed the same year with Peterborough United were the last to be promoted to the Football League, while Scarborough themselves formed part of the new Northern Counties League. The arrival of Eddy Brown as manager and Bessie Braddock, MP for Liverpool Exchange, as president, heralded a new era for the club. After the collapse of the Northern Counties League, Scarborough joined the new North Eastern League and were victorious, finishing as champions during their sole season in it.

== The Wembley Years: Cup glory ==
The Midland Football League was back for 1963–64 with Scarborough deciding to rejoin; carrying momentum over from their previous season's success the Seasiders finished as runners-up, narrowly losing out to Grantham Town. At the end of the season the highly popular manager Eddy Brown left after a dispute with the board, much to the displeasure of the fans. In the following years the club were not as prominent in the league, though 1964–65 saw a positive run in the FA Cup. Scarborough knocked out league side Bradford City before going out to fellow Yorkshire club Doncaster Rovers 2–1 in a Second Round replay watched by 7,802 fans. Alan Franks proved important during this period, scoring 116 goals in 42 league matches.

Boro finally left the Midland League for good when they became founding members of the Northern Premier League in 1968. It took the club a little while to adjust to the new league, but by the early 1970s they had improved significantly. 1972–73 was particularly notable all round with Colin Appleton at the helm. The club finished as runners-up in the league, missing out on the top spot to Boston United. The same season Scarborough knocked Oldham Athletic out of the FA Cup, before going out to Doncaster Rovers once again in the Second Round. In the FA Trophy the club earned a trip to Wembley where they defeated Wigan Athletic 2–1. For the rest of the decade Scarborough managed to finish in the top 5 within the league, but it was their cup runs which gained wide attention.

Boro made it to Wembley in the FA Trophy for three finals in a row during the mid-1970s; the first they lost 4–0 to Matlock Town, the second they beat Dagenham and the third in 1976–77 the club beat Stafford Rangers 3–2 with Sean Marshall grabbing the winner in extra time. In the FA Cup the Seasiders had two significant runs in the latter part of the 1970s which saw them reach the Third Round. First in 1975–76, Scarborough knocked out Preston North End, before losing 2–1 to eventual semi-finalists Crystal Palace in a game screened on Match of the Day. Again in 1977–78, Scarborough reached the Third Round before losing to Brighton & Hove Albion. Scarborough played in the Anglo-Italian Cup, a competition of semi-professional teams from the respective nations; with guest appearances from Gordon Banks and Alan A'Court, Boro managed to beat Udinese 4–0 in a game of the 1976 tournament. The following year in the same competition, Scarborough beat Parma 2–0 in one of the games. The club celebrated its centenary year in 1979.

== Rise into The Football League ==
Non-league football was revolutionised with the creation of the Alliance Premier League just below the Football League for the start of the 1980s. With Don Robinson as chairman, Scarborough was able to improve many elements of its ground and entered the new league. After building up a squad with seasoned former Football League players in 1980–81, Scarborough mounted a decent challenge for the championship but eventually finished third. Colin Williams was a key player for Scarborough during this time, finishing as Alliance Premier League topscorer for two seasons in a row. Fan favourite Harry Dunn, was given a warm send off in 1983 after serving the club for twenty years, playing around 900 games for the club. Crowd attendances began to decline as Scarborough generally finished in mid-table positions, as well as being unable to progress further than the First Round of the FA Cup, or perform well in the FA Trophy. Despite John Hanson's goals.

Success in the Bob Lord Trophy, beating Barnet in 1984 was one of the rare high points of this period. Dunn returned for a spell as part-time manager, guiding the side, which included the likes of Neil Thompson to a sixth-place finish during 1984–85. New chairman Barry Adamson demanded change and brought in Neil Warnock as manager, who brought in nine new first team players. Adamson died part way through the season at age 47, which stunned the club though spurred them on to challenge for the title in his honour. Scarborough went 22 games unbeaten during part of the season, four days after beating Sutton United 2–0, the club was declared champions and promoted to The Football League for the first time in their 108-year history. Scarborough were entered into the Football League Fourth Division playing their first Football League game against Wolverhampton Wanderers in a 2–2 draw.

After gaining their footing with a solid 12th-place finish during their first season in The Football League, Scarborough reached the promotion playoffs in 1988–89 due to finishing fifth, though they lost out to Leyton Orient. Rivalry with York City picked up during this period. Scarborough were having major financial problems off the field, due to the step up; this in part led to the resignation of Warnock during the 1988–89 season, with coach Colin Morris stepping up to replace him. The business smarts of Geoffrey Richmond saved the club and a deal with McCain saw the Athletic Ground renamed the McCain Stadium, nicknamed The Theatre of Chips. Despite a bad start to the following season, which led to the dismissal of Morris and his replacement by Ray McHale, Scarborough became giant killers when they dumped Chelsea out of the League Cup in October 1989, with Martin Russell scoring the winner in the 3–2 home victory. The 1992–93 season saw the introduction of the Premier League and so the division Scarborough was in was renamed the Football League Third Division. The season brought more excitement in the League Cup as Scarborough reached the Fourth Round, knocking out Bradford City, Coventry City and Plymouth Argyle before narrowly losing 1–0 to Arsenal due to a Nigel Winterburn goal. Darren Foreman became the first Boro player to score a hat-trick in The Football League and was a prolific goalscorer throughout his stay.

Scarborough finished dangerously close to the drop zone in the 1989–90 season, despite their cup exploits, but their form improved in the two seasons that followed, which saw finishes of 9th and 12th respectively. They were again in play-off contention for much of 1992–93, but a dismal run of form saw McHale sacked and replaced by Phil Chambers as the season drew to a close. Chambers in turn was dismissed only a few months into the following season after a poor start (though his cause was not helped by having had to sell off much of his squad during the summer), and replaced by Steve Wicks, who engineered a major turnaround in form to finish in 14th place. Richmond took control of Bradford City in 1994 and their chairman Dave Simpson took control of Scarborough in a "swap" move. Simpson in turn sold the club to John Russell later that year.

A decent FA Cup run in 1994–95 saw Boro make it to a Third Round replay, before going out to Watford. Their league form, however, sunk to new lows that season. Wicks was harshly sacked just before the season started and replaced by the more experienced Billy Ayre, who himself lasted just five months as manager and was sacked with the club bottom of the league. The managerial merry-go-round came full circle as Ray McHale was reinstated as manager just a year-and-a-half since being sacked, but he had little more luck turning things around and they finished second-bottom of the Football League after statistically the club's worst-ever season, with only goals scored keeping them above bottom-place Exeter City. 1995–96 proved to be another thoroughly dismal campaign, and a horrific late-season run resulted in another second-bottom finish, albeit with a more comfortable gap over bottom-placed Torquay United. McHale finally threw the towel in and resigned weeks before the season ended, leaving coach Mitch Cook in charge for the final few matches, and making this the fourth season in a row that the club had not kept a manager in charge throughout the campaign.

After finding a stable manager in Mick Wadsworth, Scarborough were able to overturn several seasons of struggle to secure a 12th-place finish in 1996–97, before reaching the Third Division playoffs the following year; unfortunately for the club they crashed 7–2 on aggregate to Torquay United. The following season in 1998–99 saw the club stuck to the bottom of the table for most of the campaign, leading to Wadsworth resigning and Colin Addison taking over as manager. Results quickly improved under the new manager, but all the other teams near the bottom also went on good runs of form at the same time, meaning that all Scarborough could do was not get cut adrift at the bottom. They finally managed to move off bottom place after the penultimate match, but in a dramatic ending to the season, Scarborough were relegated from The Football League due to a goal in the last minute, of the last day of the season by Carlisle United's on-loan goalkeeper Jimmy Glass. The fact that their 48 points was (and remains to this day) the highest for a club finishing bottom of any division was of little comfort to the fans. This was the first relegation in the history of the club, and it would ultimately prove to be the beginning of a downward spiral from which the club would never recover.
