= Harry Dunn (footballer, born 1948) =

English footballer and manager

Personal information
- Date of birth: 1948 (age 77–78)
- Place of birth: Scarborough, England
- Position: Centre-back

Youth career
- 1964–1965: Scarborough

Senior career*
Years	Team	Apps	(Gls)
1965–1983	Scarborough		
1983–1984	Frickley Athletic		
1984–1986	Scarborough		

Managerial career
- 1982: Scarborough (player-manager)
- 1984–1986: Scarborough (player-manager)
- * Club domestic league appearances and goals

Harry Dunn (born 1948) is an English football manager and former player.

Dunn played almost his entire career with his hometown club Scarborough, aside from a season-and-a-half with Frickley Athletic. He re-joined Scarborough in a player-manager capacity, by which point he had become the club's all-time record appearance holder.

== Career ==
Duun played football from a young age, and was inspired by Bobby Moore to play as a centre-back. He garnered the attention of his hometown club Scarborough, after friends of manager Eddy Brown informally scouted him in a inter-schools tournament. At the age of sixteen, while attending a local technical college, he was recruited by the club to play for their "A" team. On 27 November 1965, Dunn made his debut with Scarborough, then in the Midland League, in a match against Grantham Town. Following this, he quickly cemented himself in the side, which was enough to earn a fortnight's trial at Manchester City, representing their "A" team three times. Dunn decided not to sign with the Citizens, and returned to Scarborough. He would become the club's record appearance holder in all competitions, with 901, while also being named Player of the Year twice. Dunn was involved in the club's FA Trophy runs in the 1970s, beginning with the 1973 final. The club would later go on to reach the final in three consecutive seasons, losing in the 1975 final to Matlock Town, and winning the next two against Stafford Rangers and Dagenham. Dunn, alongside Jeff Barmby, appeared in all four finals; he played in every minute of the finals, whereas Barmby was named as a substitute in two finals. Dunn was also involved in two FA Cup runs during the same decade, where the club reached the third round, being knocked out by Crystal Palace in the 1975–76 season and Brighton & Hove Albion in the 1977–78 season.

In 1975, another player named Harry Dunn joined the club; this Dunn was given the fictitious middle initial "A" to differentiate between the two. Despite this, the younger Dunn has sometimes been credited with some of the elder Dunn's accomplishments. After a loss to Frickley Athletic, manager Jim McAnearney was sacked and Dunn took over until the end of the 1981–82 season. He left the club in 1983, and was noted as a gentleman of the game, having only been booked three times during his career. He did not travel far, moving to West Yorkshire to join Frickley. Dunn spent a season-and-a-half there, before returning to Scarborough as player-manager in November 1984. He was succeeded by Neil Warnock in May 1986.

Dunn worked as an electrician for Plaxton, and built bus and coach bodies for 40 years before his retirement.

== Honours ==
Scarborough

- Northern Premier League runners-up: 1974–75
- Northern Premier League Challenge Cup: 1976–77
- Northern Premier League Shield runners-up: 1976–77
- FA Trophy: 1972–73, 1975–76, 1976–77
- FA Trophy runners-up: 1974–75

Individual

- Scarborough F.C. Player of the Year: 1969–70, 1973–74
