= 1973 FA Trophy final =

1973 FA Trophy Final
- Event: 1972–73 FA Trophy
Scarborough	Wigan Athletic
2	1
- After extra time
- Date: 28 April 1973
- Venue: Wembley Stadium, London
- Attendance: 23,000
- Weather: Rain

The 1973 FA Trophy Final was a football match between Scarborough and Wigan Athletic on 28 April 1973 at the Wembley Stadium, London. It was the final match of the 1972–73 FA Trophy, the fourth season of the FA Trophy, The Football Association's cup competition for non-league clubs in the English football league system. Both teams were making their first appearance in the final and it was the first in the competition's history to not feature a team from the Southern League. The match was won 2–1 by Scarborough after extra time.

== Match ==
=== Details ===
28 April 1973
15:00

Scarborough	2–1 (a.e.t.)	Wigan Athletic
Leask 12'; Thompson 116'	Report	Rogers 90'

Wembley Stadium, London
Attendance: 23,000

(Scotland) Bert Garrow
(England) Colin Appleton
(England) Jimmy Shoulder
(England) Harry Dunn
(England) George Siddle
(England) Bernie Fagan
(England) Gerry Donoghue
(England) Alan Franks
(England) Malcolm Leask (substituted off)
(England) Malcolm Thompson
(England) Dick Hewitt
Substitutes:
(England) Jeff Barmby (substituted on)
Player/Manager:
(England) Colin Appleton

(Scotland) Dennis Reeves
(England) Kenny Morris
(Scotland) Billy Sutherland
(England) Mickey Taylor
(England) Albert Jackson
(England) Ian Gillibrand
(England) Paul Clements
(England) Graham Oates (substituted off)
(England) John Rogers
(England) John King
(England) Micky Worswick
Substitutes:
(England) Barry McCunnell (substituted on)
Manager:
(England) Les Rigby
