= Alan Parkinson =

Alan Parkinson may refer to:

- Alan Parkinson (footballer), English footballer
- Alan Parkinson (engineer), nuclear engineer, author, and whistleblower
