= Dick Hewitt =

English footballer

Personal information
- Full name: Richard Hewitt
- Date of birth: 25 May 1943
- Place of birth: Moorthorpe, England
- Date of death: 11 October 2017 (aged 74)
- Place of death: Scarborough, England
- Position: Midfielder

Senior career*
Years	Team	Apps	(Gls)
- Moorthorpe St J OB
1961–1964	Huddersfield Town	0	(0)
1964–1965	Bradford City	20	(7)
1965–1969	Barnsley	99	(20)
1969–1972	York City	91	(7)
1972–?	Scarborough	214	(19)
- * Club domestic league appearances and goals

Richard Hewitt (25 May 1943 – 11 October 2017) was an English footballer. He played in the Football League for Barnsley and York City. He won the FA Trophy at Wembley in the 1973 FA Trophy Final, whilst finishing his playing career with Scarborough. He later became a publican in the town.

Hewitt died on 11 October 2017 at age 74.
