= Albert Smithson =

English footballer

Personal information
- Place of birth: Blackhall, Co Durham, England
- Positions: Striker; inside right

Senior career*
Years	Team	Apps	(Gls)
	Horden Colliery Welfare	?	(?)
1931–1932	Southampton	0	(0)
1932–1935	Aldershot	35	(14)
1935–1936	Scarborough	?	(?)
	Scunthorpe & Lindsey United	?	(?)
- * Club domestic league appearances and goals

Albert Smithson (born 1911, date of death unknown) was an English footballer. He was born in Blackhall, Co Durham. He played for Horden Colliery Welfare, Southampton, Aldershot, Scarborough and Scunthorpe & Lindsey United.
