= Malcolm Thompson (footballer) =

English footballer

Personal information
- Full name: Malcolm George Thompson
- Date of birth: 19 October 1946
- Place of birth: Beverley, England
- Date of death: 24 October 2014 (aged 68)
- Place of death: Hull, East Riding of Yorkshire, England
- Position: Striker

Senior career*
Years	Team	Apps	(Gls)
?–1968	Goole Town	?	(?)
1968–1970	Hartlepool United	46	(9)
1970–1971	Corby Town	?	(?)
1971–1974	Scarborough	176	(65)
1975–?	Goole Town	?	(?)
- * Club domestic league appearances and goals

Malcolm George Thompson (19 October 1946 – 24 October 2014) was an English footballer. Whilst with Scarborough, he scored the winning goal in the 1973 FA Trophy Final, in extra-time against Wigan Athletic.

He played for Goole Town, Hartlepool United, Corby Town and Scarborough. He made 46 appearances for Hartlepool in the Football League, scoring 9 goals.
