= Jack Rand =

English footballer

Personal information
- Full name: John Edward Rand
- Date of birth: 19 June 1902
- Place of birth: Cockfield, England
- Date of death: 1970 (aged 67–68)
- Position: Inside right

Senior career*
| Years | Team | Apps | (Gls) |
- Cockfield
| 1925–1926 | Everton | 0 | (0) |
| 1926–1927 | Watford | 6 | (0) |
- Flint Town
- Connah's Quay & Shotton
| 1929–1930 | Darlington | 10 | (7) |
| 1930–1931 | Tunbridge Wells Rangers | | |
| 1931–1932 | Scarborough | 0 | (0) |
- West Stanley
- * Club domestic league appearances and goals

John Edward Rand (19 June 1902 – 3 June 1970) was an English footballer.

He played for Cockfield, Everton, Watford, Flint Town, Connah's Quay & Shotton, Darlington, briefly at Tunbridge Wells Rangers then to Scarborough and West Stanley.
