= John Woodall (footballer) =

English footballer

Personal information
- Full name: Bertram John Woodall
- Date of birth: 16 January 1949 (age 77)
- Place of birth: Goole, England
- Position: Striker

Senior career*
Years	Team	Apps	(Gls)
?–1967	Goole Town		
1967–1968	York City	2	(0)
1968–1969	Selby Town		
1969–?	Goole Town		
?–1974	Gainsborough Trinity		
1974–1975	Rotherham United	26	(6)
1975–?	Scarborough		
?–1981	Selby Town		
1981–?	Goole Town		
- Gainsborough Trinity
- * Club domestic league appearances and goals

Bertram John Woodall (born 16 January 1949), more commonly known as John Woodall, is an English former footballer.

== Career ==
Woodall was playing for Goole Town before joining York City in February 1967 as a part-timer to provide cover for Ted MacDougall, after being spotted by former Goole manager George Teasdale. He made two appearances for the side before moving onto Selby Town in May 1968, where he played until 1969 when he rejoined Goole. He then played at Gainsborough Trinity before returning to the Football League with Rotherham United in March 1974. He made 26 appearances and scored six goals in the league whilst at the club, after which he joined Scarborough in March 1975. He played in three FA Trophy finals for Scarborough, in 1975, 1976, when he scored in the 3–2 win over Stafford Rangers and 1977. He finished as the club's top scorer in two consecutive seasons; 1975–76 (30 goals) and 1976–77 (24 goals). He later rejoined Selby and then returned to Goole in 1981. He went on to finish his career with a return to Gainsborough.

He won the Player of the year award in 1976, whilst playing for Scarborough.
