= Peter Cook (English footballer) =

English footballer

Personal information
- Full name: Peter Henry Cook
- Date of birth: 1 February 1927
- Place of birth: Hull, England
- Date of death: 1960 (aged 32–33)
- Position: Wing half

Senior career*
Years	Team	Apps	(Gls)
	Kingston Wolves	?	(?)
1946	Hull City	5	(0)
1946–1949	Scarborough	?	(?)
1949–1950	Bradford City	1	(0)
1950–1953	Crewe Alexandra	47	(6)
- * Club domestic league appearances and goals

Peter Henry Cook (1 February 1927 – 1960) was an English footballer.

He played for Kingston Wolves, Hull City, Scarborough, Bradford City and Crewe Alexandra.
