= Ellis Stafford =

English footballer

Personal information
- Date of birth: 17 August 1929
- Place of birth: Sheffield, England
- Date of death: 29 October 2007 (aged 78)
- Place of death: Peterborough, Cambridgeshire, England
- Position: Fullback

Senior career*
Years	Team	Apps	(Gls)
- Scarborough
1960–1963	Peterborough United	17	(0)
- * Club domestic league appearances and goals

Ellis Stafford (17 August 1929 – 29 October 2007) was an English footballer.

He played for Scarborough and Peterborough United.
