= 1972–73 FA Trophy =

FA Challenge Trophy

Tournament details
- Country: England; Wales
- Teams: 200

Final positions
- Champions: Scarborough (1st title)
- Runners-up: Wigan Athletic

The 1972–73 FA Trophy was the fourth season of the FA Trophy.

== Preliminary round ==
=== Ties ===
Tie	Home team	Score	Away team
1	Bedworth United	4-0	Warley
2	Bury Town	4-2	Ely City
3	Deal Town	0-3	Sittingbourne
4	Heanor Town	3-3	Worksop Town
5	Lye Town	3-3	Hinckley Athletic
6	Portmadoc	0-4	New Brighton
7	Stamford	0-1	Wisbech Town
8	Wealdstone	1-0	Waterlooville

=== Replays ===
Tie	Home team	Score	Away team
4	Worksop Town	4-0	Heanor Town
5	Hinckley Athletic	2-2	Lye Town

=== 2nd replay ===
Tie	Home team	Score	Away team
5	Lye Town	2-4	Hinckley Athletic

== First qualifying round ==
=== Ties ===
Tie	Home team	Score	Away team
1	Accrington Stanley	2-2	Boldon Colliery Welfare
2	Alfreton Town	5-1	Clifton All Whites
3	Andover	2-4	Wealdstone
4	Ashford Town (Kent)	2-1	Folkestone
5	Bacup Borough	2-0	Leyland Motors
6	Barton Town	5-1	Woolley Miners Welfare
7	Basingstoke Town	2-3	Winchester City
8	Bedworth United	3-1	Halesowen Town
9	Belper Town	0-0	Eastwood Town
10	Bethesda Athletic	5-5	Holyhead Town
11	Bletchley	4-0	Dunstable
12	Bodmin Town	1-4	Falmouth Town
13	Bridgend Town	1-2	Taunton Town
14	Bridport	1-0	Glastonbury
15	Brierley Hill Alliance	1-0	Lower Gornal Alliance
16	Bury Town	2-1	Holbeach United
17	Canterbury City	1-0	Ramsgate Athletic
18	Cheltenham Town	2-1	Cowes
19	Cinderford Town	0-1	Bath City
20	Clitheroe	2-2	Horden Colliery Welfare
21	Congleton Town	1-0	Glossop
22	Crawley Town	3-2	Metropolitan Police
23	Darlaston	3-1	Hinckley Athletic
24	Desborough Town	2-3	Bourne Town
25	Droylsden	1-2	Ashton United
26	Ellesmere Port Town	1-1	Runcorn
27	Frickley Colliery	0-3	Worksop Town
28	Frome Town	0-1	Llanelli
29	Gateshead{1}	1-2	Darwen
30	Gravesend & Northfleet	4-1	Sittingbourne
31	Gresley Rovers	0-0	Atherstone Town
32	Hatfield Town	3-1	Whitstable Town
33	Hednesford	0-3	Dudley Town
34	Horwich R M I	2-1	Formby
35	Hyde United	4-3	New Mills{1}
36	Leek Town	4-1	Oswestry Town
37	Long Eaton United	1-2	Enderby Town
38	Louth United	1-2	Bridlington Trinity
39	March Town United	4-1	Lowestoft Town
40	Mexborough Town	3-1	Sutton Town
41	Nantwich Town	0-1	Sandbach Ramblers
42	Nelson	0-6	Rossendale United
43	Netherfield	4-0	Fleetwood
44	Potton United	3-0	Biggleswade Town
45	Radcliffe Borough	5-1	Stalybridge Celtic
46	Redditch United	3-0	Lockheed Leamington
47	Retford Town	4-3	Hatfield Main
48	Rhyl	0-0	Blaenau Ffestiniog
49	Rugby Town	6-1	Loughborough United
50	Rushden Town	0-1	Maidstone United
51	Salisbury	1-0	Guildford City
52	Sheppey United	1-2	Chatham Town
53	Skegness Town	2-2	Wisbech Town
54	Skelmersdale United	4-0	Connah's Quay Nomads
55	Soham Town Rangers	2-3	Histon
56	Spalding United	0-2	Boston
57	St Helens Town	0-0	New Brighton
58	Stevenage Athletic	2-0	St Neots Town
59	Ton Pentre	2-3	Barry Town
60	Trowbridge Town	2-0	Gloucester City
61	Wadebridge Town	4-2	St Blazey
62	Welton Rovers	4-2	Barnstaple Town
63	Weston-super-Mare	2-2	Ferndale Athletic
64	Winterton Rangers	1-1	Brigg Town

=== Replays ===
Tie	Home team	Score	Away team
1	Boldon Colliery Welfare	1-4	Accrington Stanley
9	Eastwood Town	3-0	Belper Town
10	Holyhead Hotspur	2-1	Bethesda Athletic
20	Horden Colliery Welfare	5-1	Clitheroe
26	Runcorn	4-0	Ellesmere Port Town
31	Atherstone Town	1-2	Gresley Rovers
48	Blaenau Ffestiniog	3-1	Rhyl
53	Wisbech Town	2-1	Skegness Town
57	New Brighton	1-1	St Helens Town
63	Ferndale Athletic	4-2	Weston-super-Mare
64	Brigg Town	2-0	Winterton Rangers

=== 2nd replay ===
Tie	Home team	Score	Away team
57	St Helens Town	1-2	New Brighton

== Second qualifying round ==
=== Ties ===
Tie	Home team	Score	Away team
1	Ashford Town (Kent)	2-0	Hatfield Town
2	Ashton United	3-2	Rossendale United
3	Bacup Borough	2-4	Accrington Stanley
4	Barry Town	1-0	Falmouth Town
5	Barton Town	2-0	Bridlington Trinity
6	Bath City	3-2	Crawley Town
7	Bedworth United	1-1	Leek Town
8	Bletchley	1-1	Salisbury
9	Boston	2-0	Wisbech Town
10	Bridport	0-2	Llanelli
11	Brigg Town	0-1	Alfreton Town
12	Bury Town	1-2	Enderby Town
13	Chatham Town	0-2	Gravesend & Northfleet
14	Cheltenham Town	1-0	Trowbridge Town
15	Darwen	1-1	Horden Colliery Welfare
16	Dudley Town	1-2	Darlaston
17	Eastwood Town	1-3	Mexborough Town
18	Gresley Rovers	1-3	Brierley Hill Alliance
19	Histon	2-3	Bourne Town
20	Holyhead Town	0-1	Skelmersdale Town
21	Horwich R M I	1-0	Congleton Town
22	Hyde United	1-2	Blaenau Ffestiniog
23	Maidstone United	2-0	Stevenage Athletic
24	Netherfield	0-1	Radcliffe Borough
25	Potton United	1-0	Canterbury City
26	Retford Town	1-3	Worksop Town
27	Rugby Town	6-0	March Town United
28	Runcorn	0-3	New Brighton
29	Sandbach Ramblers	0-0	Redditch United
30	Taunton Town	3-1	Ferndale Athletic
31	Wadebridge Town	2-3	Welton Rovers
32	Winchester City	0-2	Wealdstone

=== Replays ===
Tie	Home team	Score	Away team
7	Leek Town	1-0	Bedworth United
8	Salisbury	0-2	Bletchley
15	Horden Colliery Welfare	4-1	Darwen
29	Redditch United	0-1	Sandbach Ramblers

== Third qualifying round ==
=== Ties ===
Tie	Home team	Score	Away team
1	Accrington Stanley	1-0	Blaenau Ffestiniog
2	Altrincham	4-3	Leek Town
3	Arnold	2-4	Mexborough Town
4	Ashton United	1-1	Radcliffe Borough
5	Banbury United	3-1	Wealdstone
6	Barton Town	2-2	Horden Colliery Welfare
7	Boston	1-3	Rugby Town
8	Boston United	1-0	Cambridge City
9	Bourne Town	2-1	Wellingborough Town
10	Bradford Park Avenue	7-0	Alfreton Town
11	Bridgwater Town	2-1	Minehead
12	Brierley Hill Alliance	1-4	Bath City
13	Cheltenham Town	1-0	Bletchley
14	Corby Town	0-1	Ashford Town (Kent)
15	Denaby United	2-1	Goole Town
16	Gainsborough Trinity	4-1	Stockton
17	Gravesend & Northfleet	2-1	Enderby Town
18	Horwich R M I	1-1	Sandbach Ramblers
19	King's Lynn	2-1	Tonbridge
20	Lancaster City	4-0	Darlaston
21	Llanelli	1-0	Dorchester Town
22	Maidstone United	2-1	Kettering Town
23	Margate	2-3	Nuneaton Borough
24	Merthyr Tydfil	3-0	Welton Rovers
25	New Brighton	0-2	Morecambe
26	Northwich Victoria	1-4	Great Harwood
27	Poole Town	1-4	Bideford
28	Potton United	0-2	Bexley United
29	Skelmersdale United	2-1	Winsford United
30	Taunton Town	2-1	Barry Town
31	Witton Albion	1-0	Bilston
32	Worksop Town	2-0	South Shields

=== Replays ===
Tie	Home team	Score	Away team
4	Radcliffe Borough	3-1	Ashton United
6	Horden Colliery Welfare	3-2	Barton Town
18	Sandbach Ramblers	4-0	Horwich R M I

== 1st round ==
The teams that given byes to this round are Stafford Rangers, Barrow, Telford United, Macclesfield Town, Hillingdon Borough, Wimbledon, Worcester City, Romford, Weymouth, Yeovil Town, Wigan Athletic, Bangor City, Mossley, Kidderminster Harriers, Bromsgrove Rovers, Burscough, Chelmsford City, Barnet, Grantham, Buxton, Burton Albion, Bedford Town, Dover, Scarborough, Matlock Town, Tamworth, Hastings United, Stourbridge, Dartford, South Liverpool, Chorley and Ilkeston Town.

=== Ties ===
Tie	Home team	Score	Away team
1	Accrington Stanley	0-2	Grantham
2	Bangor City	5-1	Great Harwood
3	Barrow	2-1	Radcliffe Borough
4	Bedford Town	2-0	Bath City
5	Bexley United	2-0	Boston United
6	Bideford	0-1	Romford
7	Bourne Town	2-5	Bridgwater Town
8	Bradford Park Avenue	2-0	Ilkeston Town
9	Bromsgrove Rovers	2-2	Ashford Town (Kent)
10	Cheltenham Town	1-2	Dover
11	Gravesend & Northfleet	2-4	Hillingdon Borough
12	Horden Colliery Welfare	1-2	Buxton
13	Lancaster City	3-1	Chorley
14	Maidstone United	1-0	Dartford
15	Merthyr Tydfil	1-0	Hastings United
16	Mexborough Town	2-1	Worksop Town
17	Mossley	0-1	Morecambe
18	Nuneaton Borough	0-0	Barnet
19	Sandbach Ramblers	3-1	Burscough
20	Scarborough	3-1	Macclesfield Town
21	Skelmersdale United	3-1	Matlock Town
22	South Liverpool	3-2	Gainsborough Trinity
23	Stafford Rangers	1-0	Denaby United
24	Stourbridge	2-1	Llanelli
25	Tamworth	2-3	Witton Albion
26	Taunton Town	1-1	Chelmsford City
27	Telford United	2-2	Altrincham
28	Weymouth	3-0	Kidderminster Harriers
29	Wigan Athletic	5-0	Burton Albion
30	Wimbledon	1-1	Banbury United
31	Worcester City	1-0	King's Lynn
32	Yeovil Town	2-3	Rugby Town

=== Replays ===
Tie	Home team	Score	Away team
9	Ashford Town (Kent)	2-1	Bromsgrove Rovers
18	Barnet	2-2	Nuneaton Borough
26	Chelmsford City	4-0	Taunton Town
27	Altrincham	2-0	Telford United
30	Banbury United	0-1	Wimbledon

=== 2nd replay ===
Tie	Home team	Score	Away team
18	Nuneaton Borough	5-0	Barnet

== 2nd round ==
=== Ties ===
Tie	Home team	Score	Away team
1	Ashford Town (Kent)	1-0	Worcester City
2	Bangor City	2-1	Lancaster City
3	Barrow	0-0	Stafford Rangers
4	Bedford Town	2-1	Dover
5	Bexley United	1-0	Merthyr Tydfil
6	Buxton	2-0	Altrincham
7	Chelmsford City	3-0	Weymouth
8	Maidstone United	1-1	Bridgwater Town
9	Mexborough Town	3-0	Grantham
10	Morecambe	3-1	Bradford Park Avenue
11	Nuneaton Borough	2-3	Wimbledon
12	Rugby Town	1-1	Romford{2}
13	Sandbach Ramblers	0-3	Scarborough
14	Stourbridge	3-0	Hillingdon Borough
15	Wigan Athletic	2-0	South Liverpool
16	Witton Albion	1-1	Skelmersdale United

=== Replays ===
Tie	Home team	Score	Away team
3	Stafford Rangers	4-1	Barrow
8	Bridgwater Town	2-0	Maidstone United
12	Romford{2}	1-0	Rugby Town
16	Skelmersdale United	0-1	Witton Albion

== 3rd round ==
=== Ties ===
Tie	Home team	Score	Away team
1	Ashford Town (Kent)	0-0	Bexley United
2	Bangor City	1-0	Buxton
3	Bedford Town	3-1	Wimbledon
4	Mexborough Town	1-3	Scarborough
5	Stafford Rangers	2-0	Bridgwater Town
6	Stourbridge	1-1	Morecambe
7	Wigan Athletic	2-0	Romford{2}
8	Witton Albion	2-4	Chelmsford City

=== Replays ===
Tie	Home team	Score	Away team
1	Bexley United	1-2	Ashford Town (Kent)
6	Morecambe	3-1	Stourbridge

== 4th round ==
=== Ties ===
Tie	Home team	Score	Away team
1	Bangor City	2-3	Ashford Town (Kent)
2	Morecambe	1-1	Wigan Athletic
3	Scarborough	2-0	Chelmsford City
4	Stafford Rangers	4-1	Bedford Town

=== Replay ===
Tie	Home team	Score	Away team
2	Wigan Athletic	0-0	Morecambe

=== 2nd replay ===
Tie	Home team	Score	Away team
2	Wigan Athletic	1-0	Morecambe

== Semi finals ==
=== Ties ===
Tie	Home team	Score	Away team
1	Ashford Town (Kent)	0-1	Scarborough
2	Wigan Athletic	0-0	Stafford Rangers

=== Replay ===
Tie	Home team	Score	Away team
2	Wigan Athletic	1-0	Stafford Rangers

== Final ==
Home team	Score	Away team
Scarborough	2-1	Wigan Athletic
