= 1975–76 FA Trophy =

1975-76 FA Trophy
FA Challenge Trophy

Tournament details
- Country: England; Wales
- Teams: 273

Final positions
- Champions: Scarborough
- Runners-up: Stafford Rangers

The 1975–76 FA Trophy was the seventh season of the FA Trophy. The Final took place on 24 April 1976 with Scarborough beating Stafford Rangers 3-2 after extra time. The referee was Ron Challis of Tonbridge.

== Preliminary round ==
=== Ties ===
Tie	Home team	Score	Away team
1	Alfreton Town	2-2	Darwen
2	Alvechurch	0-1	Paulton Rovers
3	Annfield Plain	2-2	West Auckland Town
4	Bacup Borough	0-2	Consett
5	Barking	0-0	Milton Keynes City
6	Barry Town	5-1	Llanelli
7	Basingstoke Town	5-5	Kingstonian
8	Bideford	0-2	Barnstaple Town
9	Biggleswade Town	0-10	Tilbury
10	Blackpool Mechanics	4-0	Eastwood Hanley
11	Bognor Regis Town	0-3	Horsham
12	Boreham Wood	0-0	Clapton
13	Boston	1-2	A P Leamington
14	Bridlington Trinity	2-0	Accrington Stanley
15	Bromley	1-2	Guildford & Dorking United
16	Carshalton Athletic	1-1	Sittingbourne
17	Chippenham Town	2-5	Darlaston
18	Clitheroe	0-1	Nelson
19	Corby Town	1-0	Long Eaton United
20	Corinthian Casuals	1-1	Crawley Town
21	Crook Town	1-0	Ferryhill Athletic
22	Croydon	2-0	Erith & Belvedere
23	Denaby United	1-2	Ashton United
24	Devizes Town	1-1	Southall & Ealing Borough
25	Droylsden	0-2	Retford Town
26	Dudley Town	1-1	Redditch United
27	Eastwood Town	3-1	Congleton Town
28	Ely City	2-0	Bury Town
29	Emley	4-2	Shildon
30	Enderby Town	2-0	Armitage
31	Evenwood Town	3-1	Billingham Synthonia
32	Falmouth Town	4-0	Glastonbury
33	Formby	0-1	Nantwich Town
34	Frickley Colliery	2-4	Hatfield Main
35	Gloucester City	1-1	Everwarm
36	Grays Athletic	2-1	Ware
37	Hampton	0-1	Frome Town
38	Harlow Town	0-5	Letchworth Town
39	Harrow Borough	1-3	Hayes
40	Hertford Town	1-0	Ruislip Manor
41	Histon	0-3	Lowestoft Town
42	Horden Colliery Welfare	2-2	Thackley
43	Horwich R M I	2-1	Middlewich Athletic
44	Hounslow	0-0	Chesham United
45	Hyde United	1-1	Bethesda Athletic
46	Kimberley Town	1-0	Heanor Town
47	Leek Town	0-0	Prestwich Heys
48	Lewes	0-0	Redhill
49	Louth United	1-1	Sutton Coldfield Town
50	Lye Town	1-0	Weston super Mare
51	Maidenhead United	0-2	Fareham Town
52	Mangotsfield United	0-1	Welton Rovers
53	Metropolitan Police	1-0	Waterlooville
54	Moor Green	0-1	Bedworth United
55	New Brighton	0-0	Stalybridge Celtic
56	Oldbury United	2-0	Brierley Hill Alliance
57	Ossett Albion	1-2	Whitley Bay
58	Oswestry Town	0-1	Caernarfon Town
59	Penrith	2-0	Leeds & Carnegie College
60	Radcliffe Borough	1-1	New Mills
61	Ramsgate	4-2	Medway
62	Rhyl	2-1	Blaenau Ffestiniog
63	Sheppey United	0-1	Folkestone & Shepway
64	Skegness Town	1-0	Arnold
65	Spalding United	1-2	Hednesford
66	St Helens Town	1-2	Kirkby Town
67	St Neots Town	0-2	Great Yarmouth Town
68	Staines Town	3-0	Andover
69	Stowmarket Town	0-4	Harwich & Parkeston
70	Taunton Town	2-1	Dawlish Town
71	Tow Law Town	3-2	Boldon Colliery Welfare
72	Trowbridge Town	1-0	Cinderford Town
73	Uxbridge	0-0	Cheshunt
74	Walthamstow Avenue	3-2	Hornchurch
75	Wellingborough Town	0-2	Irthlingborough Diamonds
76	Wembley	1-2	Stevenage Athletic
77	Westland-Yeovil	5-2	Bridgwater Town
78	Willington	7-3	Rossendale United
79	Wisbech Town	4-1	Gorleston
80	Witton Albion	2-3	Marine
81	Wokingham Town	0-2	Salisbury

=== Replays ===
Tie	Home team	Score	Away team
1	Darwen	3-3	Alfreton Town
3	West Auckland Town	4-0	Annfield Plain
5	Milton Keynes City	0-3	Barking
7	Kingstonian	1-5	Basingstoke Town
12	Clapton	0-1	Boreham Wood
16	Sittingbourne	1-2	Carshalton Athletic
20	Crawley Town	2-0	Corinthian-Casuals
24	Southall & Ealing Borough	1-0	Devizes Town
26	Redditch United	1-0	Dudley United
35	Everwarm	2-4	Gloucester City
42	Thackley	0-0	Horden Colliery Welfare
44	Chesham United	2-0	Hounslow
45	Bethesda Athletic	0-0	Hyde United
47	Prestwich Heys	0-2	Leek Town
48	Redhill	0-2	Lewes
49	Sutton Coldfield Town	0-1	Louth United
55	Stalybridge Celtic	4-0	New Brighton
60	New Mills	2-2	Radcliffe Borough
73	Cheshunt	3-0	Uxbridge

=== 2nd replays ===
Tie	Home team	Score	Away team
1	Alfreton Town	1-0	Darwen
42	Horden Colliery Welfare	1-0	Thackley
45	Hyde United	3-0	Bethesda Athletic
60	Radcliffe Borough	5-2	New Mills

== First qualifying round ==
=== Ties ===
Tie	Home team	Score	Away team
1	Alfreton Town	2-0	Belper Town
2	Alton Town	1-6	Basingstoke Town
3	Ashby Institute	1-2	Emley
4	Atherstone Town	3-1	Hednesford
5	Aveley	0-0	Leytonstone
6	Barnstaple Town	3-1	Bath City
7	Bishop Auckland	4-0	South Bank
8	Boreham Wood	0-0	Finchley
9	Brereton Social	4-0	Caernarfon Town
10	Bridlington Trinity	6-0	West Auckland Town
11	Canterbury	0-1	Guildford & Dorking United
12	Cheltenham Town	3-2	Barry Town
13	Chesham United	0-1	Oxford City
14	Cheshunt	1-2	Wealdstone
15	Darlaston	0-1	Lye Town
16	Dunstable	1-0	Hertford Town
17	Durham City	0-2	Willington
18	Enderby Town	2-1	A P Leamington
19	Evenwood Town	1-1	Penrith
20	Falmouth Town	7-1	Trowbridge Town
21	Ferndale Athletic	2-0	Frome Town
22	Folkestone & Shepway	0-1	Maidstone United
23	Goole Town	1-0	Tow Law Town
24	Gravesend & Northfleet	3-1	Horsham
25	Great Harwood Town	1-0	Consett
26	Great Yarmouth Town	0-0	Harwich & Parkeston
27	Hatfield Main	1-1	Blackpool Mechanics
28	Hayes	3-0	Crawley Town
29	Hitchin Town	1-1	St Albans City
30	Horden Colliery Welfare	0-0	Fleetwood
31	Ilkeston Town	1-1	Kimberley Town
32	Irthlingborough Diamonds	3-1	Bilston
33	Kirkby Town	0-1	Marine
34	Leek Town	2-1	Ashton United
35	Lewes	0-1	Ramsgate
36	Leyland Motors	1-2	Eastwood Town
37	Louth United	2-1	Rushden Town
38	Lowestoft Town	0-2	Cambridge City
39	Metropolitan Police	0-2	Carshalton Athletic
40	Nantwich Town	1-1	Horwich R M I
41	Nelson	5-1	Winterton Rangers
42	Netherfield	5-4	Whitby Town
43	Oldbury United	1-1	Bedworth United
44	Paulton Rovers	0-3	Redditch United
45	Poole Town	0-2	Southall & Ealing Borough
46	Retford Town	3-2	Sutton Town
47	Rhyl	2-0	Skelmersdale United
48	Salisbury	1-1	Fareham Town
49	Skegness Town	1-1	Corby Town
50	Stalybridge Celtic	2-2	Hyde United
51	Stevenage Athletic	1-1	Letchworth Town
52	Tilbury	0-0	Barking
53	Ton Pentre	2-0	Gloucester City
54	Tonbridge	5-1	Croydon
55	Walthamstow Avenue	2-2	Grays Athletic
56	Walton & Hersham	0-5	Tooting & Mitcham United
57	Warley County Borough	0-3	Tamworth
58	Welton Rovers	1-2	Dorchester Town
59	Westland-Yeovil	3-1	Taunton Town
60	Whitley Bay	0-0	Crook Town
61	Winsford United	2-0	Pwllheli & District
62	Wisbech Town	3-0	Ely City
63	Witney Town	0-3	Staines Town
64	Worksop Town	6-1	Radcliffe Borough

=== Replays ===
Tie	Home team	Score	Away team
5	Leytonstone	1-2	Aveley
8	Finchley	2-2	Boreham Wood
19	Penrith	2-0	Evenwood Town
26	Harwich & Parkeston	4-0	Great Yarmouth Town
27	Blackpool Mechanics	0-1	Hatfield Town
29	St Albans City	1-0	Hitchin Town
30	Fleetwood	1-1	Horden Colliery Welfare
31	Kimberley Town	3-2	Ilkeston Town
40	Horwich R M I	0-3	Nantwich Town
43	Bedworth United	0-2	Oldbury United
48	Fareham Town	1-0	Salisbury
49	Corby Town	2-0	Skegness Town
50	Hyde United	2-1	Stalybridge Celtic
51	Letchworth Town	2-0	Stevenage Athletic
52	Barking	3-2	Tilbury
55	Grays Athletic	0-2	Walthamstow Avenue
60	Crook Town	1-0	Whitley Bay

=== 2nd replays ===
Tie	Home team	Score	Away team
8	Boreham Wood	0-1	Finchley
30	Horden Colliery Welfare	1-2	Fleetwood

== Second qualifying round ==
=== Ties ===
Tie	Home team	Score	Away team
1	Alfreton Town	0-0	Retford Town
2	Barking	4-2	Wisbech Town
3	Basingstoke Town	2-1	Southall & Ealing Borough
4	Brereton Social	0-0	Rhyl
5	Bridlington Trinity	2-1	Netherfield
6	Corby Town	4-0	Louth United
7	Crook Town	1-1	Penrith
8	Dorchester Town	1-0	Westland-Yeovil
9	Dunstable	3-0	Letchworth Town
10	Eastwood Town	0-1	Atherstone Town
11	Emley	2-1	Nelson
12	Enderby Town	1-0	Irthlingborough Diamonds
13	Falmouth Town	6-2	Barnstaple Town
14	Ferndale Athletic	2-1	Ton Pentre
15	Finchley	2-2	Walthamstow Avenue
16	Goole Town	4-0	Great Harwood
17	Gravesend & Northfleet	1-0	Carshalton Athletic
18	Guildford & Dorking United	0-1	Ramsgate
19	Harwich & Parkeston	3-3	Aveley
20	Hatfield Main	0-1	Bishop Auckland
21	Hyde United	5-2	Nantwich Town
22	Lye Town	2-1	Oldbury United
23	Maidstone United	2-1	Tonbridge
24	Redditch United	5-0	Cheltenham Town
25	St Albans City	1-1	Cambridge City
26	Staines Town	0-0	Fareham Town
27	Tamworth	1-4	Leek Town
28	Tooting & Mitcham United	2-0	Hayes
29	Wealdstone	4-0	Oxford City
30	Willington	3-1	Fleetwood
31	Winsford United	1-1	Marine
32	Worksop Town	3-1	Kimberley Town

=== Replays ===
Tie	Home team	Score	Away team
1	Retford Town	0-2	Alfreton Town
4	Rhyl	2-0	Brereton Social
7	Penrith	0-2	Crook Town
15	Walthamstow Avenue	2-0	Finchley
19	Aveley	1-2	Harwich & Parkeston
25	Cambridge City	1-3	St Albans City
26	Fareham Town	0-2	Staines Town
31	Marine	2-1	Winsford United

== Third qualifying round ==
=== Ties ===
Tie	Home team	Score	Away team
1	Altrincham	2-2	Gainsborough Trinity
2	Ashington	3-2	North Shields
3	Barking	1-1	Dagenham
4	Barnet	2-2	Harwich & Parkeston
5	Bishop Auckland	3-2	Emley
6	Bishop's Stortford	1-1	Ilford
7	Chelmsford City	1-0	St Albans City
8	Chorley	2-2	Lancaster City
9	Corby Town	1-1	Nuneaton Borough
10	Crook Town	2-1	Spennymoor United
11	Dorchester Town	3-4	Dulwich Hamlet
12	Ferndale Athletic	1-3	Yeovil Town
13	Goole Town	3-0	Bridlington Trinity
14	Gravesend & Northfleet	0-0	Staines Town
15	Hendon	6-1	Basingstoke Town
16	Highgate United	1-2	Atherstone Town
17	Hyde United	2-0	Marine
18	King's Lynn	3-0	Dunstable
19	Lye Town	2-2	Enderby Town
20	Maidstone United	0-2	Tooting & Mitcham United
21	Mexborough Town	3-1	Leek Town
22	Minehead	0-0	Falmouth Town
23	Mossley	2-2	Runcorn
24	Ramsgate	1-1	Bexley United
25	Redditch United	1-2	Kidderminster Harriers
26	Retford Town	2-4	Worksop Town
27	Rhyl	1-1	Northwich Victoria
28	Slough Town	1-0	Wycombe Wanderers
29	Walthamstow Avenue	1-1	Enfield
30	Wealdstone	2-2	Leatherhead
31	Willington	3-2	Blyth Spartans
32	Woking	2-4	Sutton United

=== Replays ===
Tie	Home team	Score	Away team
1	Gainsborough Trinity	4-1	Altrincham
3	Dagenham	5-0	Barking
4	Harwich & Parkeston	5-0	Barnet
6	Ilford	1-1	Bishop's Stortford
8	Lancaster City	4-0	Chorley
9	Nuneaton Borough	1-1	Corby Town
14	Staines Town	4-1	Gravesend & Northfleet
19	Enderby Town	2-1	Lye Town
22	Falmouth Town	0-0	Minehead
23	Runcorn	2-1	Mossley
24	Bexley United	3-1	Ramsgate
27	Northwich Victoria	2-1	Rhyl
29	Enfield	4-0	Walthamstow Avenue
30	Leatherhead	1-0	Wealdstone

=== 2nd replays ===
Tie	Home team	Score	Away team
6	Bishop's Stortford	3-1	Ilford
9	Corby Town	3-0	Nuneaton Borough
22	Minehead	1-2	Falmouth Town

== 1st round ==
The teams that given byes to this round are Matlock Town, Morecambe, Scarborough, Stafford Rangers, Barrow, Telford United, Macclesfield Town, Hillingdon Borough, Wimbledon, Worcester City, Romford, Weymouth, Wigan Athletic, Bangor City, Bromsgrove Rovers, Burscough, Grantham, Buxton, Bedford Town, Dover, Hastings United, Stourbridge, Dartford, South Liverpool, Ashford Town (Kent), Kettering Town, Boston United, Gateshead United, Banbury United, Merthyr Tydfil, Burton Albion and Margate.

=== Ties ===
Tie	Home team	Score	Away team
1	Ashington	2-2	Goole Town
2	Bangor City	1-2	Telford United
3	Bishop's Stortford	1-1	Enderby Town
4	Bromsgrove Rovers	2-0	Worcester City
5	Buxton	0-0	Atherstone Town
6	Chelmsford City	0-1	Bedford Town
7	Corby Town	2-0	Kidderminster Harriers
8	Dartford	1-3	Dagenham
9	Enfield	3-0	Banbury United
10	Falmouth Town	2-3	Weymouth
11	Gainsborough Trinity	0-0	Boston United
12	Gateshead United	0-1	Bishop Auckland
13	Harwich & Parkeston	3-0	Stourbridge
14	Hastings United	4-0	Bexley United
15	Hendon	1-0	Kettering Town
16	Hillingdon Borough	4-0	Ashford Town (Kent)
17	Hyde United	3-3	South Liverpool
18	King's Lynn	0-5	Burton Albion
19	Lancaster City	4-0	Barrow
20	Leatherhed	2-2	Staines Town
21	Macclesfield Town	1-3	Runcorn
22	Margate	2-0	Dulwich Hamlet
23	Merthyr Tydfil	1-0	Yeovil Town
24	Mexborough Town	0-0	Grantham
25	Morecambe	5-2	Crook Town
26	Northwich Victoria	0-2	Wigan Athletic
27	Romford	1-1	Tooting & Mitcham United
28	Scarborough	3-2	Willington
29	Slough Town	2-1	Dover
30	Stafford Rangers	4-0	Burscough
31	Sutton United	0-0	Wimbledon
32	Worksop Town	3-5	Matlock Town

=== Replays ===
Tie	Home team	Score	Away team
1	Goole Town	3-1	Ashington
3	Enderby Town	1-1	Bishop's Stortford
5	Atherstone Town	3-0	Buxton
8	Boston United	2-4	Gainsborough Trinity
17	South Liverpool	0-2	Hyde United
20	Staines Town	1-1	Leatherhead
24	Grantham	2-1	Mexborough Town
27	Tooting & Mitcham United	4-1	Romford
31	Wimbledon	3-1	Sutton United

=== 2nd replays ===
Tie	Home team	Score	Away team
3	Bishop's Stortford	1-0	Enderby Town
20	Leatherhead	1-0	Staines Town

== 2nd round ==
=== Ties ===
Tie	Home team	Score	Away team
1	Atherstone Town	1-1	Telford United
2	Bedford Town	2-0	Hastings United
3	Bromsgrove Rovers	1-0	Leatherhead
4	Burton Albion	0-1	Stafford Rangers
5	Enfield	2-1	Bishop's Stortford
6	Goole Town	1-1	Scarborough
7	Harwich & Parkeston	4-1	Weymouth
8	Hendon	2-2	Slough Town
9	Hyde United	2-2	Morecambe
10	Lancaster City	3-3	Corby Town
11	Margate	1-2	Hillingdon Borough
12	Matlock Town	1-0	Bishop Auckland
13	Merthyr Tydfil	1-3	Tooting & Mitcham United
14	Runcorn	1-1	Gainsborough Trinity
15	Wigan Athletic	1-1	Grantham
16	Wimbledon	0-0	Dagenham

=== Replays ===
Tie	Home team	Score	Away team
1	Telford United	1-2	Atherstone Town
6	Scarborough	3-1	Goole Town
8	Slough Town	0-0	Hendon
9	Morecambe	3-2	Hyde United
10	Corby Town	0-1	Lancaster City
14	Gainsborough Trinity	0-1	Runcorn
15	Grantham	1-2	Wigan Athletic
16	Dagenham	2-0	Wimbledon

=== 2nd replays ===
Tie	Home team	Score	Away team
8	Hendon	0-1	Slough Town

== 3rd round ==
=== Ties ===
Tie	Home team	Score	Away team
1	Atherstone Town	1-1	Bromsgrove Rovers
2	Harwich & Parkeston	1-2	Bedford Town
3	Lancaster City	0-1	Enfield
4	Runcorn	2-0	Slough Town
5	Scarborough	3-0	Dagenham
6	Stafford Rangers	2-1	Matlock Town
7	Tooting & Mitcham United	2-0	Morecambe
8	Wigan Athletic	1-3	Hillingdon Borough

=== Replay ===
Tie	Home team	Score	Away team
1	Bromsgrove Rovers	1-0	Atherstone Town

== 4th round ==
=== Ties ===
Tie	Home team	Score	Away team
1	Bedford Town	1-2	Runcorn
2	Bromsgrove Rovers	0-0	Enfield
3	Scarborough	1-0	Tooting & Mitcham United
4	Stafford Rangers	2-0	Hillingdon Borough

=== Replays ===
Tie	Home team	Score	Away team
2	Enfield	2-1	Bromsgrove Rovers

== Semi finals ==
=== First leg ===
Tie	Home team	Score	Away team
1	Scarborough	1-0	Enfield
2	Stafford Rangers	1-0	Runcorn

=== Second leg ===
Tie	Home team	Score	Away team	Aggregate
1	Enfield	0-0	Scarborough	0-1
2	Runcorn	0-0	Stafford Rangers	0-1

== Final ==
Home team	Score	Away team
Scarborough	3-2	Stafford Rangers
