= John Hanson (English footballer) =

English footballer

Personal information
- Date of birth: 3 December 1962 (age 63)
- Place of birth: Bradford, England
- Position: Striker

Senior career*
Years	Team	Apps	(Gls)
1980–1981	Bradford City	1	(0)
1982–1984	Scarborough	75	(25)
- * Club domestic league appearances and goals

John Hanson (born 3 December 1962) is an English former footballer.

He played for Bradford City and Scarborough.
