= 1974–75 FA Trophy =

FA Challenge Trophy

Tournament details
- Country: England; Wales
- Teams: 294

Final positions
- Champions: Matlock Town (1st title)
- Runners-up: Scarborough

The 1974–75 FA Trophy was the sixth season of the FA Trophy.

== Preliminary round ==
=== Ties ===
Tie	Home team	Score	Away team
1	Atherstone Town	3-0	Enderby Town
2	Basingstoke Town	4-0	Waterlooville
3	Bilston	3-0	Warley County Borough
4	Blackpool Mechanics	2-1	Leyland Motors
5	Bridport	1-5	Taunton Town
6	Caernarfon Town	0-1	Rhyl
7	Cambridge City	1-1	Letchworth Town
8	Crook Town	0-1	Willington
9	Croydon	0-0	Redhill
10	Darlaston	1-2	Halesowen Town
11	Darwen	2-1	Skelmersdale United
12	Dawlish Town	2-1	Wadebridge Town
13	Deal Town	0-2	Ramsgate
14	Dorchester Town	0-0	Devizes Town
15	Durham City	5-0	Whitley Bay
16	Eastwood Town	0-1	Brereton Social
17	Edgware	2-2	Ware
18	Emley	2-0	Thackley
19	Erith & Belvedere	2-3	Tonbridge
20	Falmouth Town	5-0	Exmouth Town
21	Ferndale Athletic	2-1	Weston-super-Mare
22	Finchley	1-0	Wealdstone
23	Folkestone & Shepway	4-1	Faversham Town
24	Formby	2-2	St Helens Town
25	Frome Town	1-2	Witney Town
26	Glastonbury	1-3	Bridgwater Town
27	Goole Town	4-0	Yorkshire Amateur
28	Gornal Athletic	0-1	Dudley Town
29	Grays Athletic	0-1	Walthamstow Avenue
30	Great Harwood w/o-scr Ormskirk		
31	Great Yarmouth Town	0-1	Stowmarket Town
32	Hallam	1-2	Worksop Town
33	Harlow Town	0-1	Enfield
34	Harrogate Town	1-0	Guiseley
35	Hayes	1-0	Wembley
36	Hertford Town	3-1	Clapton
37	Histon	3-1	Ely City
38	Hitchin Town	4-1	Rothwell Town
39	Horden Colliery Welfare	4-2	Ferndale Athletic
40	Horsham	1-2	Guildford & Dorking United
41	Hounslow	1-2	Wokingham Town
42	Hyde United	1-0	Horwich R M I
43	Kimberley Town	2-3	Arnold
44	Lancaster City	4-1	Fleetwood
45	Leek Town	0-7	Winsford United
46	Lewes	2-0	Crawley Town
47	Leytonstone	1-1	Leyton
48	Long Eaton United	1-1	Hednesford
49	Louth United	2-0	Wisbech Town
50	Lowestoft Town	0-2	Harwich & Parkeston
51	Maidenhead United	3-3	Kingstonian
52	Maidstone United	0-2	Gravesend & Northfleet
53	Mangotsfield United	3-6	Llanelli
54	Marine	4-2	Witton Albion
55	Metropolitan Police	2-1	Corinthian-Casuals
56	Moor Green	2-1	Brierley Hill Alliance
57	Netherfield	1-0	Accrington Stanley
58	New Mills	4-7	Nantwich Town
59	Oldbury United	1-3	Lye Town
60	Ossett Albion	1-1	Denaby United
61	Oswestry Town	1-0	Eastwood Hanley
62	Oxford City	4-0	Milton Keynes City
63	Penrith	2-1	Evenwood Town
64	Poole Town	2-1	Fareham Town
65	Portmadoc w/o-scr Connah's Quay Nomads		
66	Prestwich Heys w/o-scr Ellemsere Port Town		
67	Pwllhelli & District	0-2	Blaenau Ffestiniog
68	Radcliffe Borough	2-0	Clitheroe
69	Redditch United	2-1	Bedworth United
70	Retford Town	0-2	Heanor Town
71	Rossendale United	2-0	Nelson
72	Runcorn	1-0	New Brighton
73	Salisbury	0-0	Andover
74	Shildon	3-2	Whitby Town
75	Sittingbourne	1-1	Canterbury City
76	Skegness Town	2-0	March Town United
77	Soham Town Rangers	2-0	Gorleston
78	Southall	1-0	Ruislip Manor
79	Spalding United	2-1	Corby Town
80	St Albans City	1-1	Harrow Borough
81	St Blazey	2-3	Bideford
82	St Neots Town	0-1	Biggleswade Town
83	Staines Town	2-1	Hampton
84	Stalybridge Celtic	0-2	Droylsden
85	Stanley United scr-w/o Bishop Auckland		
86	Stevenage Athletic	1-2	Dunstable
87	Stockton	1-4	South Bank
88	Sudbury Town	3-0	Potton United
89	Sutton Coldfield Town	2-3	A P Leamington
90	Sutton Town	0-1	Belper Town
91	Tilbury	1-1	Dagenham
92	Ton Pentre	0-3	Everwarm
93	Tooting & Mitcham United	5-1	Medway
94	Tow Law Town	5-2	Consett
95	Trowbridge Town	4-1	Gloucester City
96	Uxbridge	3-2	Chesham United
97	Wellingborough Town	0-1	Rushden Town
98	Welton Rovers	3-5	Cinderford Town
99	West Auckland Town	3-0	Bridlington Trinity
100	Whitstable Town	1-3	Sheppey United
101	Winterton Rangers	2-3	Hatfield Main
102	Woolley Miners Welfare	1-1	Frickley Colliery

=== Replays ===
Tie	Home team	Score	Away team
7	Letchworth Town	0-2	Cambridge City
9	Redhill	0-2	Croydon
14	Devizes Town	1-0	Dorchester Town
17	Ware	2-3	Edgware
24	St Helens Town	2-3	Formby
47	Leyton	0-3	Leytonstone
48	Hednesford	0-2	Long Eaton United
51	Kingstonian	1-0	Maidenhead United
60	Denaby United	0-5	Ossett Albion
73	Andover	2-2	Salisbury
75	Canterbury City	3-0	Sittingbourne
80	Harrow Borough	1-0	St Albans City
91	Dagenham	2-2	Tilbury
102	Frickley Colliery	1-2	Woolley Miners Welfare

=== 2nd replays ===
Tie	Home team	Score	Away team
73	Salisbury	2-0	Andover
91	Tilbury	2-4	Dagenham

== First qualifying round ==
=== Ties ===
Tie	Home team	Score	Away team
1	Alton Town	1-3	Staines Town
2	Arnold	1-2	Spalding United
3	Ashton United	1-5	Leeds & Carnegie College
4	Atherstone Town	3-1	Lye Town
5	Barking	0-1	Leytonstone
6	Barnstaple Town	3-5	Taunton Town
7	Basingstoke Town	0-2	Devizes Town
8	Bethesda Athletic	2-2	Porthmadoc
9	Bideford	1-5	Falmouth Town
10	Biggleswade Town	1-0	Soham Town Rangers
11	Billingham Synthonia	1-2	Shildon
12	Bishop Auckland	3-1	Willington
13	Boldon Colliery Welfare	4-3	Annfield Plain
14	Boreham Wood	0-0	Harrow Borough
15	Boston	0-1	Heanor Town
16	Brereton Social	2-0	Belper Town
17	Cambridge City	4-0	Bury Town
18	Canterbury City	1-0	Bromley
19	Chippenham Town	2-1	Salisbury
20	Cinderford Town	0-1	Everwarm
21	Croydon	1-1	Metropolitan Police
22	Dagenham	3-0	Hayes
23	Darwen	1-1	Rossendale United
24	Dawlish Town	1-2	Bridgwater Town
25	Dudley Town	4-0	Halesowen Town
26	Durham City	2-2	Tow Law Town
27	Emley	2-3	Prestwich Heys
28	Feltham	0-6	Enfield
29	Ferndale Athletic	1-1	Cheltenham Town
30	Folkestone & Shepway	1-2	Tooting & Mitcham United
31	Formby	2-0	Netherfield
32	Great Harwood	4-3	Blackpool Mechanics
33	Guildford & Dorking United	0-0	Carshalton Athletic
34	Harrogate Town	1-1	Hyde United
35	Harwich & Parkeston	3-1	Histon
36	Hatfield Main	1-2	Goole Town
37	Hertford Town	1-2	Cheshunt
38	Kingstonian	0-1	Wokingham Town
39	Lancaster City	2-0	Bacup Borough
40	Lewes	0-2	Bognor Regis Town
41	Llanelli	0-0	Bath City
42	Long Eaton United	0-3	Alvechurch
43	Louth United	2-0	Woolley Miners Welfare
44	Moor Green	0-2	Bilston
45	Nantwich Town	0-5	Altrincham
46	Ossett Albion	1-2	Droylsdne
47	Oswestry Town	1-0	Marine
48	Oxford City	1-0	Uxbridge
49	Penrith	2-4	Horden Colliery Welfare
50	Redditch United	0-0	A P Leamington
51	Rhyl	4-3	Blaenau Ffestiniog
52	Runcorn	4-0	Congleton Town
53	Rushden Town	1-3	Sudbury Town
54	Sheppey United	2-2	Gravesend & Northfleet
55	Skegness Town	2-0	Alfreton Town
56	South Bank	3-0	West Auckland Town
57	Southall	0-1	Edgware
58	Stowmarket Town	0-0	Hitchin Town
59	Tonbridge	1-1	Ramsgate
60	Trowbridge Town	1-2	Poole Town
61	Walthamstow Avenue	2-0	Finchley
62	Winsford United	2-1	Radcliffe Borough
63	Witney Town	2-1	Dunstable
64	Worksop Town	8-0	Barton Town

=== Replays ===
Tie	Home team	Score	Away team
8	Portmadoc	0-2	Bethesda Athletic
14	Harrow Borough	1-1	Boreham Wood
21	Metropolitan Police	2-0	Croydon
23	Rossendale United	2-3	Darwen
26	Tow Law Town	2-1	Durham City
29	Cheltenham Town	4-0	Ferndale Athletic
33	Carshalton Athletic	2-1	Guildford & Dorking United
34	Hyde United	2-1	Harrogate Town
41	Bath City	3-0	Llanelli
50	A P Leamington	4-0	Redditch United
54	Gravesend & Northfleet	4-0	Sheppey United
58	Hitchin Town	5-0	Stowmarket Town
59	Ramsgate	3-4	Tonbridge

=== 2nd replay ===
Tie	Home team	Score	Away team
14	Boreham Wood	0-2	Harrow Borough

== Second qualifying round ==
=== Ties ===
Tie	Home team	Score	Away team
1	A P Leamington	1-2	Brereton Social
2	Altrincham	0-0	Runcorn
3	Atherstone Town	6-0	Alvechurch
4	Bath City	2-1	Everwarm
5	Bilston	3-0	Dudley Town
6	Bishop Auckland	3-1	Tow Law Town
7	Bognor Regis Town	0-3	Dagenham
8	Bridgwater Town	0-1	Falmouth Town
9	Cambridge City	3-1	Edgware
10	Carshalton Athletic	0-0	Gravesend & Northfleet
11	Cheltenham Town	3-1	Chippenham Town
12	Cheshunt	1-1	Enfield
13	Darwen	1-4	Lancaster City
14	Droylsden	0-3	Hyde United
15	Goole Town	4-1	Skegness Town
16	Great Harwood	2-0	Formby
17	Harwich & Parkeston	0-1	Hitchin Town
18	Leeds & Carnegie College	2-1	Prestwich Heys
19	Louth United	2-2	Heanor Town
20	Metropolitan Police	1-0	Leytonstone
21	Oxford City	0-1	Devizes Town
22	Rhyl	1-1	Bethesda Athletic
23	Shildon	3-2	Boldon Colliery Welfare
24	South Bank	3-0	Horden Colliery Welfare
25	Staines Town	2-2	Harrow Borough
26	Sudbury Town	0-0	Biggleswade Town
27	Taunton Town	1-2	Poole Town
28	Tonbridge	0-1	Canterbury City
29	Walthamstow Avenue	1-2	Tooting & Mitcham United
30	Winsford United	2-1	Oswestry Town
31	Witney Town	2-1	Wokingham Town
32	Worksop Town	3-2	Spalding United

=== Replays ===
Tie	Home team	Score	Away team
2	Runcorn	0-0	Altrincham
10	Gravesend & Northfleet	2-0	Carshalton Athletic
12	Enfield	2-1	Cheshunt
19	Heanor Town	2-3	Louth United
22	Bethesda Athletic	3-0	Rhyl
25	Harrow Borough	0-3	Staines Town
26	Biggleswade Town	1-2	Sudbury Town

=== 2nd replay ===
Tie	Home team	Score	Away team
2	Altrincham	1-1	Runcorn

=== 3rd replay ===
Tie	Home team	Score	Away team
2	Altrincham	2-0	Runcorn

== Third qualifying round ==
=== Ties ===
Tie	Home team	Score	Away team
1	Ashington	0-1	Blyth Spartans
2	Aveley	1-1	Bishop's Stortford
3	Bath City	3-4	Cheltenham Town
4	Bethesda Athletic	1-3	Northwich Victoria
5	Bilston	1-0	Devizes Town
6	Brereton Social	2-0	Louth United
7	Cambridge City	1-2	Hendon
8	Canterbury City	2-1	Metropolitan Police
9	Chorley	1-1	Altrincham
10	Dagenham	3-0	Slough Town
11	Gainsborough Trinity	1-1	Atherstone Town
12	Goole Town	5-0	Spennymoor United
13	Hitchin Town	1-0	Barnet
14	Hyde United	1-4	Mossley
15	Ilford	3-0	Wycombe Wanderers
16	Kidderminster Harriers	3-4	Highgate United
17	King's Lynn	2-1	Nuneaton Borough
18	Lancaster City	1-0	Shildon
19	Leatherhead	4-1	Gravesend & Northfleet
20	Margate	4-1	Dulwich Hamlet
21	Mexborough Town	3-3	Burton Albion
22	Minehead	1-2	Yeovil Town
23	North Shields	0-1	Bishop Auckland
24	Poole Town	3-2	Falmouth Town
25	South Bank	2-0	Leeds & Carnegie College
26	Sudbury Town	2-2	Enfield
27	Sutton Town	3-0	Woking
28	Tamworth	0-1	Matlock Town
29	Tooting & Mitcham United	3-0	Walton & Hersham
30	Winsford United	5-2	Great Harwood
31	Witney Town	4-1	Staines Town
32	Worksop Town	4-1	Ilkeston Town

=== Replays ===
Tie	Home team	Score	Away team
2	Bishop's Stortford	0-0	Aveley
9	Altrincham	5-1	Chorley
11	Atherstone Town	1-1	Gainsborough Trinity
21	Burton Albion	3-0	Mexborough Town
26	Enfield	5-0	Sudbury Town

=== 2nd replay ===
Tie	Home team	Score	Away team
2	Aveley	1-4	Bishop's Stortford
11	Gainsborough Trinity	1-4	Atherstone Town

== 1st round ==
The teams that given byes to this round are Morecambe, Scarborough, Stafford Rangers, Barrow, Telford United, Macclesfield Town, Hillingdon Borough, Wimbledon, Worcester City, Romford, Weymouth, Wigan Athletic, Bangor City, Bromsgrove Rovers, Burscough, Chelmsford City, Grantham, Buxton, Bedford Town, Dover, Hastings United, Stourbridge, Dartford, South Liverpool, Ashford Town, Bexley United, Kettering Town, Boston United, Gateshead United, Sandbach Ramblers, Banbury United and Merthyr Tydfil.

=== Ties ===
Tie	Home team	Score	Away team
1	Atherstone Town	1-1	Burton Albion
2	Banbury United	1-1	Enfield
3	Barrow	0-2	Lancaster City
4	Bexley United	2-2	Ashford Town
5	Bishop Auckland	0-1	Morecambe
6	Burscough	1-1	Bangor City
7	Buxton	0-0	Boston United
8	Canterbury Town	3-0	Yeovil Town
9	Chelmsford City	2-3	Ilford
10	Cheltenham Town	7-1	Bromsgrove Rovers
11	Dover	2-1	Dartford
12	Goole Town	3-0	Brereton Social
13	Grantham	1-1	Worksop Town
14	Hendon	2-2	Hillingdon Borough
15	Highgate United	2-0	Worcester City
16	Hitchin Town	1-1	Bedford Town
17	Leatherhead	5-1	Hastings United
18	Macclesfield Town	1-3	Mossley
19	Matlock Town	3-0	King's Lynn
20	Merthyr Tydfil	0-3	Kettering Town
21	Northwich Victoria	3-0	Winsford United
22	Poole Town	1-5	Margate
23	Romford	1-0	Bishop's Stortford
24	Sandbach Ramblers	1-2	South Liverpool
25	Scarborough	4-0	Gateshead United
26	South Bank	2-1	Blyth Spartans
27	Stafford Rangers	0-1	Bilston
28	Stourbridge	2-2	Telford United
29	Weymouth	2-1	Tooting & Mitcham United
30	Wigan Athletic	3-1	Altrincham
31	Wimbledon	3-1	Sutton United
32	Witney Town	2-2	Dagenham

=== Replays ===
Tie	Home team	Score	Away team
1	Burton Albion	4-2	Atherstone Town
2	Enfield	1-1	Banbury United
4	Ashford Town	2-1	Bexley United
6	Bangor City	1-2	Burscough
7	Boston United	4-1	Buxton
13	Worksop Town	2-3	Grantham
14	Hillingdon Borough	3-1	Hendon
16	Bedford Town	3-1	Hitchin Town
28	Telford United	4-0	Stourbridge
32	Dagenham	3-0	Witney Town

=== 2nd replay ===
Tie	Home team	Score	Away team
2	Banbury United	0-4	Enfield
	at Chesham United FC		

== 2nd round ==
=== Ties ===
Tie	Home team	Score	Away team
1	Ashford Town	1-1	Bedford Town
2	Bilston	1-3	Mossley
3	Boston United	1-1	Scarborough
4	Burscough	1-1	Matlock Town
5	Burton Albion	1-0	South Bank
6	Dagenham	1-1	Canterbury City
7	Enfield	2-1	Dover
8	Goole Town	1-1	South Liverpool
9	Grantham	0-0	Lancaster City
10	Hillingdon Borough	0-1	Highgate United
11	Ilford	1-0	Margate
12	Morecambe	2-3	Telford United
13	Northwich Victoria	2-4	Wigan Athletic
14	Romford	4-1	Cheltenham Town
15	Weymouth	2-0	Leatherhead
16	Wimbledon	1-0	Kettering Town

=== Replays ===
Tie	Home team	Score	Away team
1	Bedford Town	4-3	Ashford Town
3	Scarborough	1-0	Boston United
4	Matlock Town	3-1	Burscough
6	Canterbury City	0-2	Dagenham
8	South Liverpool	0-4	Goole Town
9	Lancaster City	1-0	Grantham

== 3rd round ==
=== Ties ===
Tie	Home team	Score	Away team
1	Burton Albion	2-1	Mossley
2	Dagenham	1-0	Weymouth
3	Goole Town	2-1	Romford
4	Highgate United	1-2	Bedford Town
5	Lancaster City	0-2	Wigan Athletic
6	Matlock Town	1-1	Ilford
7	Scarborough	2-1	Enfield
8	Wimbledon	4-1	Telford United

=== Replay ===
Tie	Home team	Score	Away team
6	Ilford	0-1	Matlock Town

== 4th round ==
=== Ties ===
Tie	Home team	Score	Away team
1	Dagenham	1-3	Burton Albion
2	Goole Town	0-1	Matlock Town
3	Scarborough	1-0	Wimbledon
4	Wigan Athletic	0-1	Bedford Town

== Semi finals ==
=== First leg ===
Tie	Home team	Score	Away team
1	Matlock Town	0-1	Burton Albion
2	Scarborough	3-1	Bedford Town

=== Second leg ===
Tie	Home team	Score	Away team	Aggregate
1	Burton Albion	0-2	Matlock Town	1-2
2	Bedford Town	1-3	Scarborough	2-6

== Final ==
Home team	Score	Away team
Matlock Town	4-0	Scarborough
