= Ray McHale =

English footballer (born 1950)

Personal information
- Full name: Raymond McHale
- Date of birth: 12 August 1950 (age 76)
- Place of birth: Sheffield, England
- Height: 5 ft 8 in (1.73 m)
- Position: Midfielder

Youth career
- Hillsborough Boys Club

Senior career*
Years	Team	Apps	(Gls)
1971–1974	Chesterfield	124	(27)
1974–1976	Halifax Town	86	(21)
1976–1980	Swindon Town	173	(33)
1980–1981	Brighton & Hove Albion	11	(0)
1981–1982	Barnsley	53	(1)
1982–1985	Sheffield United	67	(2)
1983	→ Bury (loan)	6	(0)
1985–1986	Swansea City	47	(1)
1986	Rochdale	7	(0)
1986–1987	Scarborough	25	(3)
Total		599	(88)

Managerial career
- 1989–1993: Scarborough
- 1994–1996: Scarborough
- 1999: Scarborough (caretaker)
- 2001: Scarborough (caretaker)
- * Club domestic league appearances and goals

Raymond McHale (born 12 August 1950) is an English former professional footballer who played as a midfielder. McHale began his career with Chesterfield before moving to Halifax Town. He later played the Football League for Swindon Town, Brighton & Hove Albion, Barnsley, Sheffield United, Swansea City, Bury, Rochdale and Scarborough. making 599 appearances and scoring 87 goals. He had two spells as manager of Scarborough in the Football League.
