= Alan Parkinson (footballer) =

English footballer (1932–2002)

Personal information
- Date of birth: 5 May 1932
- Place of birth: Sheffield, England
- Date of death: 2002
- Position: Striker

Senior career*
Years	Team	Apps	(Gls)
1950–1955	Bradford Park Avenue	13	(4)
1955–1957	Scarborough	97	(67)
- * Club domestic league appearances and goals

Alan Parkinson (5 May 1932 – 2002) was an English footballer.

He played for Bradford Park Avenue and Scarborough.
