= 1976–77 FA Trophy =

1976-77 FA Trophy
FA Challenge Trophy

Tournament details
- Country: England; Wales
- Teams: 191

Final positions
- Champions: Scarborough
- Runners-up: Dagenham

The 1976–77 FA Trophy was the eighth season of the FA Trophy.

== Preliminary round ==
=== Ties ===
Tie	Home team	Score	Away team
1	Accrington Stanley	5-1	Nelson
2	Alfreton Town	0-1	Spalding United
3	Alton Town	1-0	Westland-Yeovil
4	Alvechurch	2-1	Oxford City
5	Andover	1-0	Wokingham Town
6	Armitage	1-0	Moor Green
7	Arnold	2-1	Sutton Town
8	Aveley	1-0	Sittingbourne
9	Bacup Borough	1-2	Thackley
10	Barnstaple Town	1-5	Taunton Town
11	Barry Town	3-2	Ton Pentre
12	Bedworth United	3-1	Heanor Town
13	Bideford	2-0	Glastonbury
14	Bootle	0-2	Blackpool Mechanics (Mechanics disqualified)
15	Boreham Wood	1-2	Hornchurch
16	Brereton Social	0-2	Bilston
17	Bromley	3-0	Medway
18	Cambridge City	3-1	Irthlingborough Diamonds
19	Carshalton Athletic	3-0	Tonbridge
20	Cheltenham Town	5-2	Welton Rovers
21	Chesham United	8-0	Harlow Town
22	Cheshunt	1-0	Witney Town
23	Cinderford Town	1-1	Weston super Mare
24	Clapton	3-0	Hounslow
25	Clevedon	3-1	Trowbridge Town
26	Corinthian-Casuals	0-4	Canterbury City
27	Darlaston	2-1	Sutton Coldfield Town
28	Dawlish Town	0-0	Bridgwater Town
29	Eastwood Hanley	4-1	Tamworth
30	Eastwood Town	0-0	Dudley Town
31	Finchley w/o-scr Stevenage Athletic		
32	Folkestone & Shepway	1-1	Crawley Town
33	Gloucester City	2-2	Brierley Hill Alliance
34	Guildford & Dorking United	0-1	Waterlooville
35	Hampton	2-0	Dunstable
36	Hatfield Main	1-2	Boldon Community Association
37	Hednesford	1-3	Belper Town
38	Hertford Town	0-0	Harrow Borough
39	Histon	1-4	Gorleston
40	Kirkby Town	1-2	Skelmersdale United
41	Lewes	1-2	Horsham
42	Llanelli	0-2	Everwarm
43	Louth United	2-0	Boston
44	Lowestoft Town	2-0	Wisbech Town
45	Maidenhead United	0-1	Wembley
46	Metropolitan Police	1-1	Letchworth Garden City
47	Oldbury United	4-1	Ilkeston Town
48	Paulton Rovers	4-3	Mangotsfield United
49	Poole Town	1-1	Fareham Town
50	Pwllheli & District	3-3	Oswestry Town
51	Salisbury	1-1	Frome Town
52	Sheppey United	1-0	Grays Athletic
53	Skegness Town	1-3	Long Eaton United
54	Walton & Hersham	1-0	Bognor Regis Town
55	Ware	0-0	Milton Keynes City
56	Wellingborough Town	1-0	Stowmarket Town

=== Replays ===
Tie	Home team	Score	Away team
23	Weston super Mare	0-1	Cinderford Town
28	Bridgwater Town	2-0	Dawlish Town
30	Dudley Town	4-0	Eastwood Town
32	Crawley Town	1-2	Folkestone & Shepway
33	Brierley Hill Alliance	1-3	Gloucester City
38	Harrow Borough	2-0	Hertford Town
46	Letchworth Garden City	4-2	Metropolitan Police
49	Fareham Town	0-1	Poole Town
50	Oswestry Town	1-0	Pwllheli & District
51	Frome Town	0-4	Salisbury
55	Milton Keynes City	2-2	Ware

=== 2nd replay ===
Tie	Home team	Score	Away team
55	Ware	2-3	Milton Keynes City

== First qualifying round ==
=== Ties ===
Tie	Home team	Score	Away team
1	Accrington Stanley	2-1	Emley
2	Alvechurch	1-0	Cinderford Town
3	Andover	1-2	Basingstoke Town
4	Armitage	2-2	Dudley Town
5	Ashton United	3-0	Prestwich Heys
6	Barking	0-1	Hornchurch
7	Barry Town	2-3	Everwarm
8	Bath City	3-0	Dorchester Town
9	Bideford	2-1	Salisbury
10	Bilston	0-2	Leek Town
11	Bootle	2-1	Darwen
12	Bridlington Trinity	1-0	Ferryhill Athletic
13	Bromley	2-1	Carshalton Athletic
14	Canterbury City	3-2	Gravesend & Northfleet
15	Cheltenham Town	2-1	Clevedon
16	Chesham United - Bye		
17	Chorley	2-1	Billingham Synthonia
18	Clapton	1-3	Hayes
19	Corby Town	1-0	Belper Town
20	Crook Town	1-0	Durham City
21	Croydon	0-0	Sheppey United
22	Droylsden	3-0	Worksop Town
23	Eastwood Hanley	0-3	Witton Albion
24	Enderby Town	0-1	Long Eaton United
25	Evenwood Town	1-1	Horden Colliery Welfare
26	Ferndale Athletic	3-1	Gloucester City
27	Frickley Athletic	3-1	Whitley Bay
28	Gorleston	0-1	Hitchin Town
29	Hampton	2-5	Barnet
30	Harrow Borough	5-3	Cheshunt
31	Highgate United	2-2	Redditch United
32	Horsham	1-0	Woking
33	Hyde United	1-5	Stalybridge Celtic
34	Kingstonian	0-1	Alton Town
35	Letchworth Garden City	2-1	Finchley
36	Louth United	1-2	Arnold
37	Lowestoft Town	1-2	Cambridge City
38	Lye Town	1-0	Darlaston
39	Middlewich Athletic	0-2	Winsford United
40	Milton Keynes City	1-2	Leytonstone
41	Minehead	2-0	Bridgwater Town
42	Nantwich Town	4-0	Oldbury United
43	Netherfield	4-0	North Shields
44	New Brighton Rakers	1-0	Horwich R M I
45	Paulton Rovers	3-2	Taunton Town
46	Penrith	5-1	South Bank
47	Radcliffe Borough	0-1	St Helens Town
48	Ramsgate	0-0	Folkestone & Shepway
49	Retford Town	0-0	New Mills
50	Rhyl	2-0	Oswestry United
51	Rossendale United	2-3	Consett
52	Shildon	0-2	Whitby Town
53	Skelmersdale United	0-3	Formby
54	Southall & Ealing Borough	1-1	St Albans City
55	Spalding United	3-1	Bedworth United
56	Thackley	1-1	Boldon Community Association
57	Tilbury	0-1	Aveley
58	Walthamstow Avenue	1-0	Harwich & Parkeston
59	Walton & Hersham	0-0	Staines Town
60	Waterlooville	2-1	Poole Town
61	Wealdstone	3-1	Wellingborough Town
62	Wembley	0-2	A P Leamington
63	West Auckland Town	1-0	Great Harwood

=== Replays ===
Tie	Home team	Score	Away team
4	Dudley Town	2-1	Armitage
21	Sheppey United	0-4	Croydon
25	Horden Colliery Welfare	0-1	Evenwood Town
31	Redditch United	2-2	Highgate United
48	Folkestone & Shepway	3-2	Ramsgate
49	New Mills	0-0	Retford Town
54	St Albans City	2-0	Southall & Ealing Borough
56	Boldon Community Association	0-0	Thackley
59	Staines Town	1-0	Walton & Hersham

=== 2nd replays ===
Tie	Home team	Score	Away team
31	Highgate United	2-0	Redditch United
49	Retford Town	2-4	New Mills
56	Thackley	1-3	Boldon Community Association

== Second qualifying round ==
=== Ties ===
Tie	Home team	Score	Away team
1	Alvechurch	2-0	Spalding United
2	Arnold	0-1	A P Leamington
3	Ashton United	0-3	St Helens Town
4	Aveley	0-0	Basingstoke Town
5	Bideford	0-2	Bath City
6	Bridlington Trinity	0-4	Crook Town
7	Cambridge City	1-1	Staines Town
8	Chorley	5-1	Boldon Community Association
9	Consett	0-0	Tow Law Town
10	Corby Town	0-1	Highgate United
11	Croydon	1-2	Wealdstone
12	Dudley Town	0-2	Cheltenham Town
13	Evenwood Town	1-3	Droylsden
14	Folkestone & Shepway	1-1	Bromley
15	Formby	0-1	Winsford United
16	Frickley Athletic	2-1	Netherfield
17	Hayes	3-1	Canterbury City
18	Hornchurch	1-1	Horsham
19	Letchworth Garden City	0-2	Hitchin Town
20	Leytonstone	2-4	Barnet
21	Lye Town	0-1	Long Eaton United
22	Minehead	6-1	Ferndale Athletic
23	Nantwich Town	0-1	Witton Albion
24	New Brighton Rakers	2-1	Leek Town
25	Paulton Rovers	1-2	Everwarm
26	Rhyl	1-1	New Mills
27	St Albans City	3-0	Alton Town
28	Stalybridge Celtic	1-0	Bootle
29	Walthamstow Avenue	1-0	Harrow Borough
30	Waterlooville	5-0	Chesham United
31	West Auckland Town	2-2	Penrith
32	Whitby Town	1-1	Accrington Stanley

=== Replays ===
Tie	Home team	Score	Away team
4	Basingstoke Town	3-0	Aveley
7	Staines Town	3-1	Cambridge City
9	Tow Law Town	1-3	Consett
14	Bromley	1-1	Folkestone & Shepway
18	Horsham	4-1	Hornchurch
26	New Mills	3-2	Rhyl
31	Penrith	3-5	West Auckland Town
32	Accrington Stanley	2-4	Whitby Town

=== 2nd replay ===
Tie	Home team	Score	Away team
14	Folkestone & Shepway	1-0	Bromley

== Third qualifying round ==
=== Ties ===
Tie	Home team	Score	Away team
1	Altrincham	3-1	Buxton
2	Bangor City	5-0	Long Eaton United
3	Barnet	1-1	Wealdstone
4	Barrow	0-2	Gateshead United
5	Basingstoke Town	1-1	Waterlooville
6	Bishop's Stortford	2-0	Ilford
7	Cheltenham Town	6-0	Worcester City
8	Chorley	0-0	Mossley
9	Dartford	2-1	Ashford Town (Kent)
10	Dover	2-0	Dulwich Hamlet
11	Everwarm	0-0	Nuneaton Borough
12	Frickley Athletic	3-0	Droylsden
13	Gainsborough Trinity	0-4	West Auckland Town
14	Goole Town	0-1	Consett
15	Hastings United	0-0	Folkestone & Shepway
16	Hendon	2-1	Maidstone United
17	Highgate United	0-2	Bath City
18	Hitchin Town	3-0	King's Lynn
19	Horsham	1-0	Sutton United
20	Kidderminster Harriers	1-1	Alvechurch
21	Macclesfield Town	3-0	Stalybridge Celtic
22	Mexborough Town	1-3	Bishop Auckland
23	Minehead	3-2	A P Leamington
24	Northwich Victoria	3-0	New Mills
25	Slough Town	4-0	Hayes
26	South Liverpool	5-0	Burscough
27	St Albans City	1-1	Staines Town
28	Stourbridge	1-2	Banbury United
29	Walthamstow Avenue	1-0	Chelmsford City
30	Whitby Town	3-3	Crook Town
31	Winsford United	4-1	New Brighton Rakers
32	Witton Albion	1-0	St Helens Town

=== Replays ===
Tie	Home team	Score	Away team
3	Wealdstone	0-3	Barnet
5	Waterlooville	2-1	Basingstoke Town
8	Mossley	1-3	Chorley
11	Nuneaton Borough	3-2	Everwarm
15	Folkestone & Shepway	1-3	Hastings United
20	Alvechurch	2-3	Kidderminster Harriers
27	Staines Town	4-0	St Albans City
30	Crook Town	2-0	Whitby Town

== 1st round ==
The teams that given byes to this round are Scarborough, Matlock Town, Morecambe, Stafford Rangers, Telford United, Hillingdon Borough, Wimbledon, Romford, Weymouth, Wigan Athletic, Bromsgrove Rovers, Grantham, Bedford Town, Kettering Town, Boston United, Merthyr Tydfil, Burton Albion, Margate, Yeovil Town, Atherstone Town, Runcorn, Lancaster City, Enfield, Wycombe Wanderers, Dagenham, Tooting & Mitcham United, Leatherhead, Marine, Blyth Spartans, Willington, Spennymoor United and Falmouth Town.

=== Ties ===
Tie	Home team	Score	Away team
1	Altrincham	2-1	Winsford United
2	Atherstone Town	1-1	Cheltenham Town
3	Barnet	0-1	Wycombe Wanderers
4	Bedford Town	1-3	Walthamstow Avenue
5	Bishop's Stortford	1-2	Hendon
6	Boston United	2-2	Wigan Athletic
7	Burton Albion	3-2	Bromsgrove Rovers
8	Consett	0-3	Matlock Town
9	Crook Town	3-1	West Auckland Town
10	Enfield	0-2	Slough Town
11	Grantham	0-1	Wimbledon
12	Hillingdon Borough	2-3	Staines Town
13	Hitchin Town	4-0	Romford
14	Horsham	2-2	Dartford
15	Kettering Town	7-3	Dover
16	Kidderminster Harriers	2-2	Bangor City
17	Lancaster City	2-3	Willington
18	Leatherhead	1-1	Dagenham
19	Macclesfield Town	1-0	Gateshead United
20	Margate	1-2	Tooting & Mitcham United
21	Marine	0-3	Chorley
22	Minehead	2-1	Bath City
23	Morecambe	2-0	Blyth Spartans
24	Nuneaton Borough	4-2	Banbury United
25	Scarborough	3-1	Frickley Athletic
26	South Liverpool	2-6	Runcorn
27	Spennymoor United	2-1	Northwich Victoria
28	Telford United	1-1	Stafford Rangers
29	Waterlooville	1-1	Hastings United
30	Weymouth	1-1	Falmouth Town
31	Witton Albion	1-1	Bishop Auckland
32	Yeovil Town	0-0	Merthyr Tydfil

=== Replays ===
Tie	Home team	Score	Away team
2	Cheltenham Town	1-2	Atherstone Town
6	Wigan Athletic	2-1	Boston United
14	Dartford	3-1	Horsham
16	Bangor City	2-0	Kidderminster Harriers
18	Dagenham	3-0	Leatherhead
28	Stafford Rangers	1-0	Telford United
29	Hastings United	0-1	Waterlooville
30	Falmouth Town	2-3	Weymouth
31	Bishop Auckland	0-1	Witton Albion
32	Merthyr Tydfil	1-3	Yeovil Town

== 2nd round ==
=== Ties ===
Tie	Home team	Score	Away team
1	Altrincham	2-0	Atherstone Town
2	Bangor City	2-2	Hitchin Town
3	Chorley	3-1	Burton Albion
4	Crook Town	1-0	Witton Albion
5	Dagenham	1-1	Yeovil Town
6	Dartford	1-3	Tooting & Mitcham United
7	Matlock Town	3-2	Kettering Town
8	Morecambe	2-2	Staines Town
9	Nuneaton Borough	1-0	Spennymoor United
10	Runcorn	2-1	Wycombe Wanderers
11	Slough Town	1-1	Minehead
12	Walthamstow Avenue	0-0	Scarborough
13	Waterlooville	0-2	Hendon
14	Weymouth	2-1	Stafford Rangers
15	Willington	3-1	Macclesfield Town
16	Wimbledon	3-2	Wigan Athletic

=== Replays ===
Tie	Home team	Score	Away team
2	Hitchin Town	2-1	Bangor City
5	Yeovil Town	1-2	Dagenham
8	Staines Town	0-0	Morecambe
11	Minehead	0-0	Slough Town
12	Scarborough	2-1	Walthamstow Avenue

=== 2nd replays ===
Tie	Home team	Score	Away team
8	Morecambe	2-1	Staines Town
11	Slough Town	2-1	Minehead

== 3rd round ==
=== Ties ===
Tie	Home team	Score	Away team
1	Altrincham	1-0	Matlock Town
2	Crook Town	3-3	Slough Town
3	Dagenham	1-0	Runcorn
4	Hitchin Town	0-0	Scarborough
5	Morecambe	3-2	Tooting & Mitcham United
6	Nuneaton Borough	2-1	Willington
7	Weymouth	1-1	Hendon
8	Wimbledon	2-2	Chorley

=== Replays ===
Tie	Home team	Score	Away team
2	Slough Town	2-1	Crook Town
4	Scarborough	3-1	Hitchin Town
7	Hendon	1-5	Weymouth
8	Chorley	2-2	Wimbledon

=== 2nd replay ===
Tie	Home team	Score	Away team
8	Wimbledon	0-2	Chorley

== 4th round ==
=== Ties ===
Tie	Home team	Score	Away team
1	Chorley	1-1	Dagenham
2	Scarborough	1-1	Nuneaton Borough
3	Slough Town	2-0	Morecambe
4	Weymouth	0-0	Altrincham

=== Replays ===
Tie	Home team	Score	Away team
1	Dagenham	5-1	Chorley
2	Nuneaton Borough	0-1	Scarborough
4	Altrincham	2-1	Weymouth

== Semi finals ==
=== First leg ===
Tie	Home team	Score	Away team
1	Dagenham	3-0	Slough Town
2	Scarborough	2-0	Altrincham

=== Second leg ===
Tie	Home team	Score	Away team	Aggregate
1	Slough Town	2-3	Dagenham	2-6
2	Altrincham	2-0	Scarborough	2-2

=== Replay ===
Tie	Home team	Score	Away team
2	Scarborough	0-0	Altrincham

=== 2nd replay ===
Tie	Home team	Score	Away team
2	Scarborough	2-1	Altrincham

== Final ==
Home team	Score	Away team
Scarborough	2-1	Dagenham
