= Jeff Barmby =

English footballer (1943–2021)

Personal information
- Full name: Jeffrey Barmby
- Date of birth: 15 January 1943
- Place of birth: Hull, England
- Date of death: 18 July 2021 (aged 78)
- Place of death: Hull, England
- Position: Striker

Senior career*
Years	Team	Apps	(Gls)
–1963	Selby Town		
1963–1964	York City	2	(0)
1964–1970	Goole Town		
1970–1976	Scarborough	358	(156)
- * Club domestic league appearances and goals

Jeffrey Barmby (15 January 1943 – 18 July 2021) was an English footballer; he was the father of England international Nick Barmby. and grandfather of Jack Barmby. Daughter Debbie, widow Pat.

== Life and career ==
Barmby began his career with Selby Town before joining York City as an amateur in March 1963. He made two appearances for the side and moved on to Goole Town in 1964, where he played until 1970 when he joined Scarborough.

He finished his first season with Scarborough as top scorer with 29 goals, and also was on two further occasions in 1973–74 (joint top scorer with Malcolm Leask) and 1974–75 (31 goals).

He made four appearances at Wembley Stadium with Scarborough in the finals of the FA Trophy, in 1973, 1975, 1976 and 1977, in three of which he was on the winning team.

He scored 14 hat-tricks in his Scarborough career.

Barmby died on 18 July 2021, at the age of 78.
