= Scarborough F.C. =

Former association football club based in Scarborough, England

- Full name: Scarborough Football Club Ltd
- Nicknames: Seadogs, Boro
- Founded: 1879; 147 years ago
- Dissolved: 20 June 2007; 19 years ago
- Ground: Athletic Ground
- Capacity: 6,408
- 2006–07: Conference North, 20th
Home colours	Away colours

Scarborough Football Club was a football club based in the seaside resort of Scarborough, North Yorkshire. They were one of the oldest football clubs in England, formed in 1879, before they were wound up on 20 June 2007, with debts of £2.5 million. They played at the Athletic Ground from 1898 until the club's dissolution.

Scarborough formed in 1879 and entered the FA Cup for the first time in 1887. They entered the Northern League in 1898 and remained there for 28 years, apart from four seasons spent in the Yorkshire Combination from 1910 to 1914. They moved to the Yorkshire League in 1926 and switched to the Midland League the following year, being crowned as Midlands League champions in 1929–30. In 1960, they moved into the Northern Counties League, and would win the North Eastern League title in their only season in the division – 1962–63. Returning to the Midland League, they became founder members of the Northern Premier League in 1968. They won the FA Trophy on three occasions in the 1970s: 1973, 1975–76 and 1976–77, and were runners-up in 1974–75.

Scarborough were founder members of the Alliance Premier League (later named the Conference) in 1979 and in 1987 were the first team to secure automatic promotion to the Football League, which had been introduced for the 1986–87 season. They were relegated back down to the Conference in 1999, and then were relegated into the Conference North after entering administration in 2006. At the end of the 2006–07 season, Scarborough finished in 20th place, which would have resulted in their relegation to the Northern Premier League had the club not instead been liquidated. A new supporter-owned "phoenix" club was established by the Seadog Trust under the banner Scarborough Athletic on 25 June 2007, and one year later a second supporter-owned club, Scarborough Town, also came into existence, which itself folded in 2013.

== History ==
The club was formed in 1879 by members of the town's cricket team, and played their earliest games at the cricket ground on North Marine Road. The football club soon moved to the nearby Recreation Ground. In 1898, Scarborough Football Club made the move across town to the Athletic Ground on Seamer Road and remained there until 2007, though the ground was renamed The McCain Stadium in a pioneering sponsorship deal in 1988.

=== Early years ===
Scarborough squad of 1885

Scarborough first entered England's national cup competition, the FA Cup, in 1887. Before the club became professional, they spent their time competing in the Northern League.

It was in 1927 the Yorkshire club became professional and joined the Midland League. After only three years, they became champions of it, breaking the record for most points in a season. The same year, the club were performing respectably in the FA Cup, reaching the third round, before going out 2–1 to Grimsby Town who were in the nation's top league at the time.

Club attendance records were broken when the club reached the same stage of the FA Cup again, during the 1937–38 season. The game against Luton Town, which was a 1–1 draw, saw 11,162 people packed into the Athletic Ground. Unfortunately for Scarborough, they were soundly defeated 5–1 in the replay.

=== 1970s FA Trophy success ===
Because of their decent performance in the Midlands League, the club were entitled to become one of the founding clubs in the new Northern Premier League in 1968. The 1970s would prove to be a successful time for the club; Scarborough won the FA Trophy three times at Wembley Stadium, beating Wigan Athletic, Stafford Rangers and Dagenham in the process.

However, there was also a tragedy for the club during the 1970s. On 18 May 1977, 21-year-old winger Tony Aveyard died after collapsing as a result of a head injury suffered in a match two days earlier.

The 1970s also saw the club performing well in the FA Cup. They reached the third round in the 1975–76 season before losing 2–1 to Crystal Palace in a match that was featured on BBC's Match of the Day. During the 1977–78 season, they reached these heights again, with a third round clash against Brighton & Hove Albion; they lost the tie 3–0 at the Goldstone Ground in front of 23,748 spectators.

They also took part in the Anglo-Italian Cup twice, beating Udinese 4–0 in 1976, and then beating Parma 2–0 during the following year's competition. They lost 4–1 on aggregate to Lecce in the final match. Gordon Banks played for Scarborough, in the opening game of that season's competition (against Monza). By the end of the 1970s, Scarborough had been selected to be part of the new Alliance Premier League. They stayed in this league for several seasons with generally consistent finishing positions in mid-table. The club gained a new manager named Neil Warnock, and his team became champions of the Conference in 1987. They were automatically promoted into the Football League, the first club to achieve this feat by this route.

=== The Football League era ===
In 1987, Scarborough were promoted into the Football League Fourth Division. Scarborough hosted Wolverhampton Wanderers on the first day of the season, an event which attracted national media attention, due to it being the club's debut match in the Football League. However, the match was marred by crowd trouble provoked by visiting Wolves supporters, with players having to leave the pitch during the match.

Warnock stayed as manager of Scarborough until he left for Notts County in November 1988, and has since gone on to win numerous promotions for a string of league clubs. However, the subsequent years were rather less successful for Scarborough.

Scarborough qualified for the Fourth Division play-offs in 1989, courtesy of a fifth-place finish. They were knocked out at the semi-final stage 2–1 on aggregate by Leyton Orient.

The club had mixed fortunes during their stay in the Football League. They spent several seasons near the bottom, but reached the play-offs for promotion twice. They became giant killers in 1989 with a 3–2 victory in the League Cup over Chelsea, after achieving a 1–1 draw during the first leg at Stamford Bridge. Their cup runs continued to throw up good results following this, with a 7–6 aggregate win over Preston North End, and a 5–3 defeat against Southampton (including two goals from Alan Shearer) in 1991. In October 1989, however, Scarborough lost 7–0 to eventual runners-up Oldham Athletic, in which Frankie Bunn scored six of Oldham's goals, a record for an individual player that still stands.

Their best run however, came during the 1992–93 season, where Scarborough knocked Bradford City, Coventry City and Plymouth Argyle out of the competition. This brought Arsenal to Scarborough in a tie which Arsenal narrowly won, 1–0 with a Nigel Winterburn goal. Arsenal went on to win the League Cup that year.

In 1998, they qualified for the Third Division playoffs, but lost to Torquay United in the semi-finals. The following season would bring a relegation battle rather than a promotion challenge.

The last day of the 1998–99 season – 8 May 1999 – saw Scarborough's final game as a Football League club, which they drew 1–1 at home to a Peterborough United side which featured future Premier League stars Simon Davies and Matthew Etherington. When the final whistle blew at the McCain Stadium, Carlisle United were still level with Plymouth Argyle and the Scarborough fans had already invaded the pitch to celebrate "survival", only for the news to come through within minutes that a last-minute goal from Carlisle's on-loan goalkeeper Jimmy Glass had ensured Carlisle's survival and relegated Scarborough back to the Conference, twelve years after they had left it. It was the first relegation in the history of Scarborough.

=== Back in non-league football ===
The 1999–2000 season would begin for Scarborough in the Conference – the same league they had won twelve years earlier. However, in their first season they only managed to finish in fourth place, thus failing to win promotion at the first attempt. The club maintained their football league youth policy. In this first season in the conference, the club's youth team, led by youth team manager Ian Kerr, won the football league youth alliance winning their last five games against Hull City, Bradford City, Preston North End, Carlisle United and Wrexham without conceding a goal.

Poor results saw Scarborough at the bottom of the Conference by Christmas 2001. With relegation to the Northern Premier League threatening, new chairman Malcolm Reynolds and manager Russell Slade oversaw a turnaround in the club's fortunes; the team finished twelfth at the end of the 2001–02 season. This was followed up by a seventh-place finish the following season.

2003–04 brought a fifteenth-place finish in the Conference, with the highlight of the season being an FA Cup fourth round tie with Chelsea at the McCain Stadium. Chelsea and England defender John Terry scored the only goal of the game. Slade left to join Grimsby Town, Nick Henry was appointed his successor and brought in his former Oldham Athletic team-mate Neil Redfearn as his assistant.

In the 2004–05 season, despite only finishing thirteenth in the league, Scarborough managed to go through the whole season unbeaten at home.

With the club at the bottom of the Conference, Henry was sacked in October 2005. Neil Redfearn took over as manager and brought in former Barnsley coach Eric Winstanley as assistant manager. Despite finishing bottom of the table in the 2005–06 season, Scarborough were not initially relegated, as Canvey Island resigned from the league and Altrincham were deducted 18 points for fielding an ineligible player, meaning that they occupied bottom position instead. However, the Conference were not convinced of the club's financial stability, and Scarborough ended up suffering the same fate as Northwich Victoria had the previous year by being relegated to the Conference North.

=== Final season ===
Neil Redfearn resigned in the 2006 close season and former Scarborough skipper and assistant manager Mark Patterson replaced him. Patterson re-signed striker Tony Hackworth and defender Mark Hotte. The club started their first season in the Conference North with minus 10 points as the club had been in administration. What proved to be their last game, on 28 April 2007, was a 1–0 win at Hucknall Town. However, Scarborough finished 20th, meaning that had they survived until the start of the 2007–08 season, they would have been relegated to the Northern Premier League. On 4 May 2007, Patterson left the club after failing to agree a new contract.

=== Dissolution ===
The club had been hoping to move to a new stadium on the outskirts of town by the start of the 2009–10 season, with the proceeds from the sale of the McCain Stadium to a housing developer wiping out the club's historic debts in addition to providing the finance to build the new ground. However, a covenant existed on the McCain Stadium that restricted its use only to sporting activities. The club failed to convince Scarborough Borough Council that the proposals would raise enough money to both pay off the club's debts and build a new ground. In 2017, the site of the stadium became a Lidl supermarket.

On 8 June 2007, The Football Association said that it was a very strong possibility that by 12 June, Scarborough F.C. may well go out of business. On 12 June, the club was given an eight-day "stay of execution", following a "change of heart" by their local Borough Council. But on 20 June, it was wound up in the High Court, ending its 128-year run as a club with debts of £2.5 million.

However, the winding up of Scarborough F.C paved the way for the supporter's trust to form a club as Scarborough Athletic and secure a place in the Northern Counties East League. Meanwhile, the Centre of Excellence, youth team and Football in the Community sections of Scarborough F.C. moved to the nearby George Pindar Community Sports College, with some assistance from Sheffield United. In 2008, the youth system was extended by adding an adult team named Scarborough Town, which was admitted to the Teesside League for the 2008–09 season and won the Division Two championship by going the entire season undefeated. In the 2009–10 season, Scarborough Town moved up into the Wearside League and scored 140 goals in their 36 games, as they won the championship, as well as the Sunderland Shipowners Cup. Scarborough Town F.C. folded in June 2013.

== Programme and fanzine ==
The match-day programme at Scarborough, The Boro Review, won the Conference North programme awards for the 2006–07 season. The club also had a fanzine, Abandon chip!, which at the end of the 2006–07 season had reached Issue 5, and still continues today as a Scarborough Athletic fanzine.

== Records ==
- FA Cup, Best Performance: 2003–04, fourth round vs. Chelsea
- Football League Cup, Best Performance: 1992–93, fourth round vs. Arsenal
- Record Victory: 11–0 over Stamford, 14 December 1963
- Record Defeat: 1–16 by South Bank, 15 November 1919
- Record Football League Win: 5–2 over Torquay United, 24 September 1988
- Record Football League Defeat: 1–7 by Wigan Athletic, 11 March 1997
- Most Goals in a Season: 58, Billy Clayson, 1932–33
- Record Attendance: 11,162 vs. Luton Town, 8 January 1938
- Record Transfer Fee Received: £240,000, Chris Short to Notts County in 1990
- Record Transfer Fee Paid: £102,000, Martin Russell from Leicester City in 1989

== Players ==
Player of the Year

Year	Winner
1969–70	Harry Dunn
1970–71	Jeff Barmby
1971–72	Ted Smethurst
1972–73	Colin Appleton
1973–74	Harry Dunn
1974–75	Tony Aveyard
1975–76	John Woodall
1976–77	Billy Ayre
1977–78	Dave Chapman
1978–79	Gerry Donoghue
1979–80	Neil Sellers
1980–81	Neil Sellers
1981–82	Ian Smith
1982–83	Kenny Dennis
1983–84	Bryan Magee
1984–85	Marshall Burke
1985–86	Neil Thompson
1986–87	Kevin Blackwell
1987–88	Alan Kamara

Year	Winner
1988–89	Gary Brook
1989–90	Alan Kamara
1990–91	Ian Ironside
1991–92	Tommy Mooney
1992–93	Darren Foreman
1993–94	Shaun Murray
1994–95	Jason White
1995–96	Stuart Hicks
1996–97	Jason Rockett
1997–98	Gary Bennett
1998–99	Jamie Hoyland
1999–2000	Steve Brodie
2000–01	Paul Ellender
2001–02	Andy Woods
2002–03	David Pounder
2003–04	Mark Hotte
2004–05	Chris Senior
2005–06	Michael Coulson
2006–07	Lee Cartwright

== Managerial history ==
Name	Nationality	Years
George Hall	(England)	1946–1947
Harold Taylor	(England)	1947–1948
Directors Commission	(England)	1948
Frank Taylor	(England)	1948–1950
Directors Commission	(England)	1950–1953
Reg Halton	(England)	1953–1954
Directors Commission	(England)	1954–1957
George Higgins	(Scotland)	1957–1958
Directors Commission	(England)	1958–1959
Andy Smailes	(England)	1959–1961
Eddy Brown	(England)	1961–1964
Albert Franks	(England)	1964–1965
Stuart Myers	(England)	1965–1966
Directors Commission	(England)	1966–1968
Graham Shaw	(England)	1968–1969
Directors Commission	(England)	1969
Colin Appleton	(England)	1969–1973
Gerry Donoghue	(England)	1973
Ken Boyes	(England)	1973–1974
Ken Houghton	(England)	1974–1975
Colin Appleton	(England)	1975–1981

Name	Nationality	Years
Jim McAnearney	(Scotland)	1981–1982
Harry Dunn	(England)	1982
John Cottam	(England)	1982–1984
Harry Dunn	(England)	1984–1986
Neil Warnock	(England)	1986–1989
Colin Morris	(England)	1989
Ray McHale	(England)	1989–1993
Phil Chambers	(England)	1993
Steve Wicks	(England)	1993–1994
Billy Ayre	(England)	1994
Ray McHale	(England)	1994–1996
Mitch Cook	(England)	1996
Mick Wadsworth	(England)	1996–1999
Colin Addison	(England)	1999–2000
Neil Thompson	(England)	2000–2001
Ian Kerr	(Scotland)	2001
Russell Slade	(England)	2001–2004
Nick Henry	(England)	2004–2005
Neil Redfearn	(England)	2005–2006
Mark Patterson	(England)	2006–2007

== Honours ==
League

- Football Conference (level 5)
  - Champions: 1986–87
- North Eastern League
  - Champions: 1962–63
- Midland League
  - Champions: 1929–30

Cup

- FA Trophy
  - Winners: 1972–73, 1975–76, 1976–77
  - Runners-up: 1974–75
- Northern Premier League Cup
  - Winners: 1976–77
- Bob Lord Trophy
  - Winners: 1984
  - Runners-up: 1983
- North Riding Senior Cup
  - Winners: 19 occasions since 1909
- Scarborough & East Riding County Cup
  - Winners: 1885–86, 1887–88, 1888–89, 1890–91, 1891–92, 1892–93, 1896–97, 1900–01, 1901–02, 1903–04
  - Runners-up: 1886–87, 1894–95, 1897–98
- Anglo-Italian Cup
  - Runners-up: 1976
