= List of English association football families =

This is a list of English association football families.

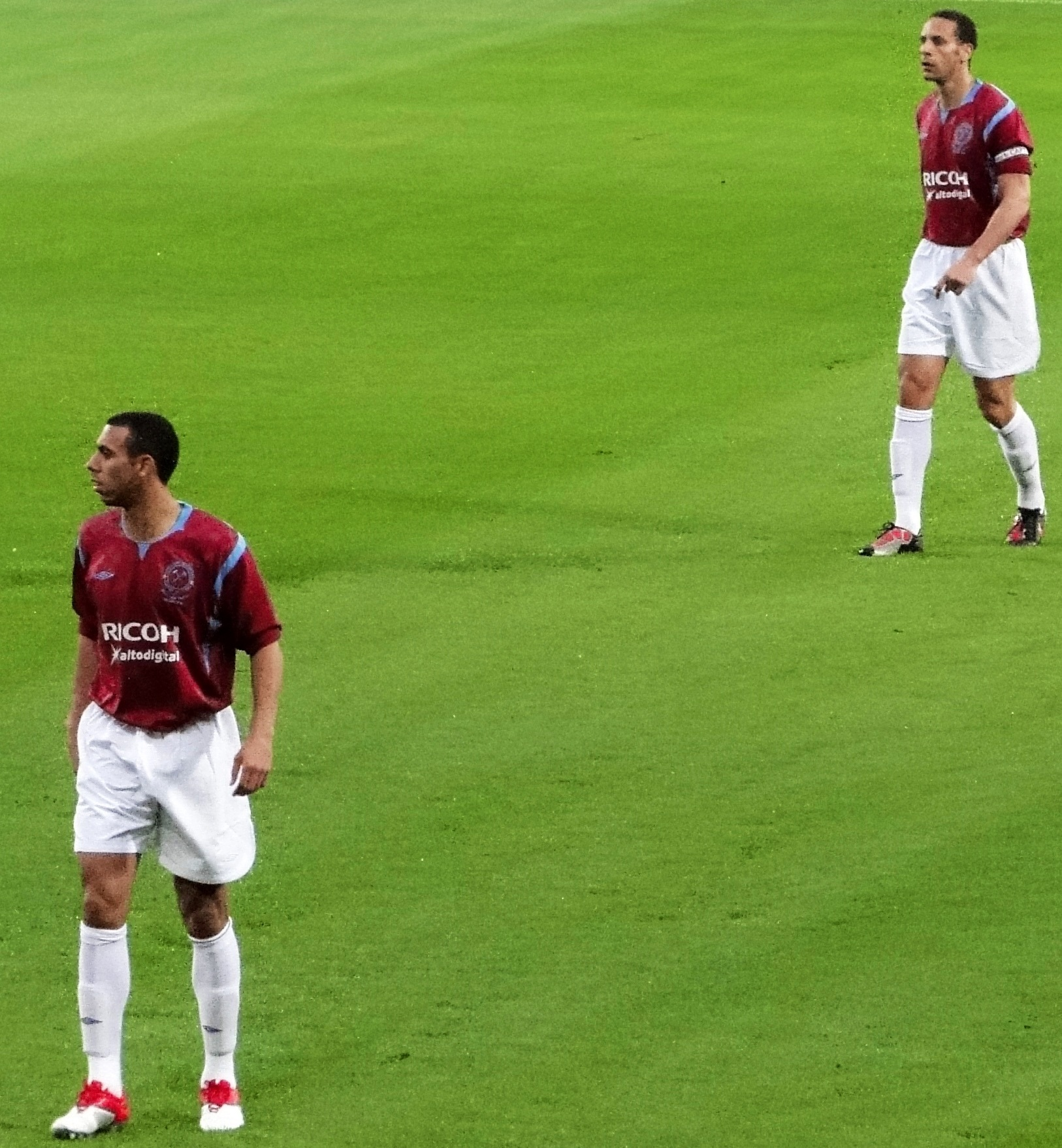
Brothers Anton (left) and Rio Ferdinand (right) are also cousins of Les and Kane Ferdinand

Families included on the list must have

1. at least, one member of the family is capped by a national team on the senior level or an important person in the game of football (e.g., notable coaches, referees, club chairmen, etc.)
2. a second member must be a professional player or capped by a national team on the U-17 level or above.

== List ==
=== A ===
- (Jamaica) Rolando Aarons, (Note: Was born in Jamaica, capped by England's under-20 side before switching allegiance to Jamaica.) Max Aarons (cousin)
- Tammy Abraham, Timmy Abraham (brother)
- Fisayo Adarabioyo, Tosin Adarabioyo (brother)
- John Alexander, Trent Alexander-Arnold (nephew)
- Sam Allardyce, Craig Allardyce (son)
- Geoff Allen, Elliot Anderson (Note: Was born in England, capped by Scotland's youth sides before switching allegiance to England.) (grandson)
- Les Allen, Dennis Allen (brother), Clive Allen (son), Paul Allen (nephew), Martin Allen (nephew/Dennis's son), Bradley Allen (son), Oliver Allen (grandson/Clive's son), Charlie Allen (grand nephew/Martin's son)
- Eniola Aluko, (Note: Was born in Nigeria but represented England internationally.) (Nigeria) Sone Aluko (Note: Was born in England and capped by England at youth levels before switching allegiance to Nigeria.) (brother)
- Viv Anderson, Louise Sharpe (cousin), Del Sharpe (cousin), (Dominica) Malachi Sharpe (first cousin of Viv & son of Del & Louise), Malika Sharpe (first cousin of Viv, Daughter of Del, Louise & sister of Malachi)
- Keith Armstrong, (Finland) Daniel Armstrong (Note: Daniel Armstrong was born in Finland while his father managed there and represented Finland internationally.) (son)
- Dan Ashworth, (Wales) Zac Ashworth (Note: Was born in England but represented Welsh youth sides internationally.) (son)
- John Aston Sr., John Aston Jr. (son)

=== B ===
- Roy Bailey, Gary Bailey (son)
- (United States) Gerry Baker, Joe Baker (brother), (Note: The Baker brothers were raised in Scotland but born in the United States and England respectively, and were only eligible to represent those at the time.) (Australia) Ryan Strain (Note: Was born in England but represented Australia internationally.) (grandson of Gerry)
- Sam Baldock, (Greece) George Baldock (Note: Was born in England but represented Greece internationally.) (brother)
- Alan Ball, Sr., Alan Ball, Jr. (son)
- Arthur Bambridge, Charles Bambridge (brother), Ernest Bambridge (brother) (Note: The only trio of brothers to have played for England.)
- Bamford :see Doughty
- Jeff Barmby, Nick Barmby (son), Jack Barmby (son of Nick)
- Bobby Barnes, (Jamaica) Giles Barnes (Note: Was born in England and capped by England at youth levels before switching allegiance to Jamaica.) (nephew), Marcus Barnes (nephew/Giles' brother)
- Ryan Barnett, Isabel Barnett (sister)
- Jim Barrett, Sr., Jim Barrett, Jr. (son)
- Gareth Barry, Bradley Barry (nephew)
- (Wales) Kayleigh Barton, Kirsty Barton (wife)
- (Scotland) Bobby Baxter Sr., Bobby Baxter Jr. (son)
- Mark Beard, Matt Beard (brother)
- Dave Beasant, Sam Beasant (son)
- Jude Bellingham, Jobe Bellingham (brother)
- Junior Bent, Darren Bent (nephew), Cory Bent (son)
- Brian Birch, (Canada) Will Johnson (grandson)
- Arthur Blackburn, Fred Blackburn (brother)
- John Bond, Kevin Bond (son)
- Ian Bowyer, Gary Bowyer (son)
- (Ireland) Peter Boyle, Tommy Boyle (son)
- (Scotland) James Brandon, (Scotland) Tom Brandon (brother), (Scotland) Harry Brandon (cousin), Tom Brandon Jr (nephew/son of Tom)
- Gary Brazil, Ellie Brazil (daughter)
- Johnny Brooks, Shaun Brooks (son)
- Ken Brown, Kenny Brown (son), Luis Brown (grandson/son of Kenny)
- Wes Brown, Clive Brown, Reece Brown (brothers)
- Steve Bruce, (Northern Ireland) Alex Bruce (Note: Was born in England, capped by the Republic of Ireland's under-21 and B side and played 2 senior international matches for the Republic of Ireland before switching allegiance to Northern Ireland.) (son)
- Frank Buckley, Chris Buckley (brother)
- (Gibraltar) Allen Bula, (Gibraltar) Danny Higginbotham (Note: Was born in England but represented Gibraltar internationally.) (nephew)
- (Scotland) Matt Busby, Don Gibson (son-in-law)
- Terry Butcher, (Note: Was born in Singapore but represented England internationally.) (Scotland) Pat Nevin (cousin)

=== C ===
- Danny Cadamarteri, (Jamaica) Bailey Cadamarteri (son)
- Kevin Campbell, Tyrese Campbell (son)
- Jamie Carragher, (Malta) James Carragher (Note: Was born in England but represented Malta internationally.) (son)
- Jess Carter, (Germany) Ann-Katrin Berger (wife)
- Robert Carter, Raich Carter (son)
- Stuart Cash, (Poland) Matty Cash (Note: Was born in England but represented Poland internationally.) (son)
- Neville Chamberlain, Mark Chamberlain (brother), Alex Oxlade-Chamberlain (nephew/son of Mark), Christian Oxlade-Chamberlain (brother of Alex)
- Nathaniel Chalobah, (Note: Was born in Sierra Leone but represented England internationally.) Trevoh Chalobah (brother)
- Thomas Chapman, Herbert Chapman, Matt Chapman, Harry Chapman (brothers), Harry Chapman Jr. (nephew/son of Harry)
- John Charles, Clive Charles (brother)
- Charlton :see Milburn
- Chilwell :see Shuttleworth
- Lee Clark, Bobby Clark (son)
- Allan Clarke, Frank Clarke, Derek Clarke, Kelvin Clarke, Wayne Clarke (brothers)
- Ken Clayton, Ronnie Clayton (brother)
- Charles Clegg, William Clegg (brother)
- Dave Clement, Neil Clement, Paul Clement (sons)
- Brian Clough, Nigel Clough (son)
- Andy Cole, Devante Cole (son)
- Denis Compton, Leslie Compton (brother)
- Anthony Cook, (Grenada) Reice Charles-Cook, (Note: Was born in England but represented Grenada internationally.) (Grenada) Regan Charles-Cook, (Grenada) Roman Charles-Cook (brothers)
- Kenny Cooper Sr., Kenny Cooper Jr. (son)
- Terry Cooper, Mark Cooper (son), Charlie Cooper (grandson/son of Mark)
- Pauline Cope, Keith Boanas (husband)
- Alan Cork, Jack Cork (son)
- Richard Cresswell, Charlie Cresswell (son)
- Peter Croker, Ted Croker (brother), Eric Dier (grand nephew/Ted's grandson)

=== D ===
- Kevin Davies, Jamie Jackson (half-brother)
- Andy Dawson, Kevin Dawson (brother), Michael Dawson (brother)
- Jermain Defoe, Ryan Edgar (Note: Was born in England but represented Dominica internationally.) (cousin), Anthony Edgar (cousin/brother of Ryan)
- (Republic of Ireland) Rory Delap, (Note: Was born in England but represented the Republic of Ireland internationally.) Liam Delap, Finn Delap (sons)
- (Nigeria) Tom Dele-Bashiru, (Note: Was born in England, capped by England's under-16 side before switching allegiance to Nigeria.) (Nigeria) Fisayo Dele-Bashiru (brother)
- Nigel Doughty, (Wales) Michael Doughty (son), Patrick Bamford (Note: Was born in England, capped by the Republic of Ireland's under-18 side before switching allegiance to England.) (godson)
- Bob Dowie, (Northern Ireland) Iain Dowie (Note: Was born in England but represented Northern Ireland internationally.) (brother), Natasha Dowie (Note: Was born in United Arab Emirates but represented England internationally.) (daughter of Bob), Becky Easton (wife of Natasha)
- Bruce Dyer, (Montserrat) Josiah Dyer (Note: Was born in England but represented Montserrat internationally.) (son)

=== E ===
- George Eastham Sr., Harry Eastham (brother), George Eastham Jr. (son of George Sr., nephew of Harry)
- Eddie Edgar, (Canada) David Edgar (son)
- (Nigeria) Augustine Enuekwe, Chioma Ubogagu (Note: Was born in England, capped by the United States' youth sides before switching allegiance to England.) (granddaughter)

=== F ===
- Justin Fashanu, John Fashanu (brother)
- Billy Fairhurst, David Fairhurst (brother)
- (Scotland) Bob Ferrier Sr., Bob Ferrier Jr. (son) (Note: Ferrier Jnr was born in England while his father played there and was only eligible for England under rules of the time, but played all his football in Scotland.)
- William Foulke, Jim Simmons (nephew)
- Ted Fenton, Benny Fenton (brother)
- Les Ferdinand, Rio Ferdinand (cousin), Anton Ferdinand (cousin/Rio's brother), (Republic of Ireland) Kane Ferdinand (Note: Was born in England but represented Republic of Ireland youth sides internationally.) (cousin)
- (Barbados) Fabian Forde, (Note: Was born in England but represented Barbados internationally.) Shaq Forde (son)
- Fred Forman, Frank Forman (brother), Harry Linacre (nephew)
- Frank Froggatt, Jack Froggatt (nephew), Redfern Froggatt (son)

=== G ===
- Dan Gallagher, Conor Gallagher (brothers)
- Tommy Gardner, (Wales) Hannah Keryakoplis (great-granddaughter)
- Billy Garraty, Jack Grealish (Note: Was born in England, capped by the Republic of Ireland's youth sides before switching allegiance to England.) (2nd great-grandson)
- George: see Lingard
- Steven Gerrard, (Republic of Ireland) Anthony Gerrard (cousin), Bobby Duncan (cousin)
- Steve Gibson, Ben Gibson (nephew)
- David Gill, Oliver Gill (son)
- Kevin Glendon, George Glendon (son)
- John Goodall, (Ireland) Archie Goodall (brother)
- (Scotland) Lewis Goram, (Scotland) Andy Goram (Note: Was born in England but represented Scotland internationally.) (son)
- Bobby Gould, (Scotland) Jonathan Gould, Richard Gould (sons), (New Zealand) Matthew Gould (grandson, son of Jonathan)
- (Scotland) Eddie Gray, (Scotland) Stuart Gray (Eddie's son), (Scotland) Frank Gray (Eddie's brother), (Scotland) Andy Gray (Frank's son), Archie Gray and Harry Gray (Andy's sons)
- Jack Gregory, John Gregory (son)
- Jimmy Greaves, Danny Greaves (son)
- Jimmy Greenhoff, Brian Greenhoff (brother)
- (Scotland) Bryan Gunn, (Scotland) Angus Gunn (Note: Angus Gunn was born in England while his father played there, was capped by England at youth levels before switching allegiance to Scotland.) (son)

=== H ===
- (Saint Kitts and Nevis) Atiba Harris, Micah Richards (cousin)
- Colin Harvey, Brian Harvey (brother)
- Tony Hateley, Mark Hateley (son), Danielle Hill (granddaughter), Tom Hateley (grandson/Mark's son)
- (Scotland) John Hendrie, Luke Hendrie (son)
- (Scotland) Sandy Herd, (Scotland) Alec Herd (brother), (Scotland) David Herd (nephew - son of Alec)
- John Herdman, (New Zealand) Jay Herdman (son)
- Hubert Heron, Francis Heron (brother)
- Emile Heskey, Reigan Heskey, Jaden Heskey (sons), (Spain) Mateo Joseph (Note: Was born in Spain, capped by England's under-20 side before switching allegiance to Spain.) (second nephew)
- Hibbs :see Pearson
- Wally Hinshelwood, Martin Hinshelwood and Paul Hinshelwood (sons), Danny Hinshelwood (grandson, son of Martin), Adam Hinshelwood and Paul Hinshelwood (grandsons, sons of Paul), Jack Hinshelwood (great-grandson, son of Adam)
- David Hirst, (Scotland) George Hirst (Note: Was born in England and capped by England at youth levels before switching allegiance to Scotland.) (son)
- Glenn Hoddle, Carl Hoddle (brother)
- Steve Hodge, Elliot Hodge (son)
- Liam Hogan, Scott Hogan (brother)
- Eric Houghton, Roy Houghton, Reg Goodacre (cousins), Chris Woods (great-nephew)
- Steph Houghton, Stephen Darby (husband)
- Lee Howey, Steve Howey (brother)
- Charlie Hurst, Geoff Hurst (son)

=== I ===
- Paul Ince, Tom Ince (son), (Trinidad and Tobago) Clayton Ince (Paul's second cousin) Rohan Ince (Paul's third cousin), (Wales) Eric Young (Note: Was born in Singapore but represented Wales internationally.) (Rohan's uncle)
- James Iremonger, Albert Iremonger, Harry Iremonger (brothers)
- (Turkey) Muzzy Izzet, (Note: Was born in England but represented Turkey internationally.) Kemal Izzet (brother)

=== J ===
- (Scotland) Bob Jack, David Jack (son), Rollo Jack (son)
- (Scotland) Jimmy Jackson, James Jackson (son), Archie Jackson (son) (Note: The Australian cricketer Archie Jackson was also a family member (nephew/cousin respectively))
- Steve Jagielka, Phil Jagielka (brother)
- Reece James, Lauren James (sister)
- Amy James-Turner, (Wales) Angharad James-Turner (wife)
- (Jamaica) David Johnson, (Note: David Johnson was born in Jamaica, capped by England's B side and played four senior international matches for Jamaica before switching allegiance to Wales.) (Wales) Brennan Johnson (Note: Brennan Johnson was born in England while his father played there, was capped by England's under-16 and under-17 sides before switching allegiance to Wales.) (son)
- Gary Johnson, Lee Johnson (son)
- Harry Johnson Snr., Harry Johnson Jr. (son), Tom Johnson (son)

=== K ===
- (Turkey) Colin Kazim-Richards, Andros Townsend (cousin)
- Michael Keane, (Note: Was born in England, capped by the Republic of Ireland's under-17 and under-19 sides before switching allegiance to England.) (Republic of Ireland) Will Keane (Note: Was born in England and capped by England at youth levels before switching allegiance to the Republic of Ireland.) (twins)
- Martin Keown, Niall Keown (son)
- Cyril Knowles, Peter Knowles (brother)
- Konchesky :see Terry

=== L ===
- Lampard :see Redknapp
- Dave Latchford, Bob Latchford (brother), Peter Latchford (brother)
- Carl Leaburn, Miles Leaburn (son)
- Rob Lee, Olly Lee (son), Elliot Lee (son)
- Aaron Lescott, Joleon Lescott (brother)
- Maya Le Tissier, Alex Scott (step-brother)
- Harry Lilley, Will Lilley (brother)
- Jesse Lingard, Gabby George (cousin)
- Ruben Loftus-Cheek, (Guyana) Carl Cort (Note: Was born in England, and represented England at youth level before switching allegiance to Guyana.) (half-brother), (Guyana) Leon Cort (half-brother)
- Kelvin Lomax, Kieran Trippier (brother)
- Longstaff: see Thompson

=== M ===
- Ray Mabbutt, Kevin Mabbutt (son), Gary Mabbutt (son)
- (Democratic Republic of the Congo) Jacques Maghoma, (Democratic Republic of the Congo) Christian Maghoma, (Note: Was born in the Democratic Republic of the Congo, capped by England's under-16 side before switching allegiance to the Democratic Republic of the Congo.) Paris Maghoma (brothers)
- Harry Maguire, Laurence Maguire (brother)
- Gordon Marshall Sr., (Scotland) Gordon Marshall Jr. (son), (Scotland) Scott Marshall (son)
- Alvin Martin, David Martin (son), Joe Martin (son)
- Brian Marwood, James Marwood (son)
- (Saint Kitts and Nevis) Lois Maynard, (Note: Was born in England but represented Saint Kitts and Nevis internationally.) Marcus Rashford (cousin)
- Joe Mercer Sr., Joe Mercer Jr. (son)
- (Scotland) Andy McCall, (Scotland) Stuart McCall (son)
- Wilf McGuinness, Paul McGuinness (son)
- Don Megson, Gary Megson (son), (United States) Neil Megson (Note: Was born in England but represented the United States internationally.) (son)
- Jack Milburn, George Milburn (brother), Jim Milburn (brother), Jackie Milburn (cousin), Stanley Milburn (brother), Jack Charlton (nephew), Bobby Charlton (nephew)
- Percy Mills, Nigel Pearson (grandson), James Pearson (son of Nigel)
- (Scotland) Jimmy Milne, Gordon Milne (son)
- Thomas Mort, (Wales) Enoch Mort (cousin)

=== N ===
- Gary Neville, Phil Neville (brother), (Republic of Ireland) Harvey Neville (Phil's son, Gary's nephew)
- Gifton Noel-Williams, (Grenada) Dejon Noel-Williams (son)
- Keith Nobbs, Jordan Nobbs (daughter)

=== O ===
- Afolabi Obafemi, Michael Obafemi (brother)
- Micah Obiero, (Kenya) Zech Obiero (brother)
- (France) Michael Olise, (Note: Was born in England but represented France internationally.) Richard Olise (brother)
- Terry Owen, Michael Owen (son), Richie Partridge (Terry's son-in-law; Michael's brother-in-law)
- Cyril Oxley, Bernard Oxley (brother)

=== P ===
- Louis Page, Jack Page (brother), Tom Page (brother), Willie Page (brother)
- Glyn Pardoe, Mike Doyle (co-father in law), Tommy Doyle (grandson of Pardoe and Doyle)
- Jack Parry, Ray Parry (brother), Cyril Parry (brother)
- Hubert Pearson, Harold Pearson (son), Harry Hibbs (Harold's cousin), Horace Pearson (also Harold's cousin)
- Steve Potts, Dan Potts (son), Freddie Potts (son)
- Tommy Powell, Steve Powell (son)
- Bev Priestman, (New Zealand) Emma Humphries (wife)
- Linvoy Primus, (Jamaica) Atlanta Primus (daughter)
- Spencer Prior, (Australia) Natasha Prior (daughter)
- Syd Puddefoot, Len Puddefoot (brother)

=== Q ===
- (Scotland) Nigel Quashie, (Note: Was born in England, capped by England at youth levels and B side before switching allegiance to Scotland.) (Wales) Brayden Clarke (son)

=== R ===
- Herbert Rawson, William Rawson (brother)
- Harry Redknapp, Frank Lampard, Sr. (brother in law), Jamie Redknapp (son/nephew), Frank Lampard (nephew/Frank's son/cousin)
- Cyrille Regis, (Note: Was born in French Guiana but represented England internationally.) Dave Regis (cousin), (Grenada) Otis Roberts (cousin), (Grenada) Jason Roberts (nephew)
- Declan Rice, (Note: Was born in England, capped by the Republic of Ireland at youth levels and played three senior international matches for the Republic of Ireland before switching allegiance to England.) Finley Munroe (cousin)
- Andy Rhodes, Steve Agnew (brother-in-law), (Scotland) Jordan Rhodes (son)
- Kieran Richardson, Jordan Brown (cousin)
- (Scotland) Bruce Rioch, Neil Rioch (brother), Gregor Rioch (son), Matty Holmes (nephew)
- Stuart Ripley, Connor Ripley (son)
- Tony Rodwell, Jack Rodwell (nephew)
- Wayne Rooney, John Rooney (brother), Tommy Rooney (cousin), Jake Rooney (cousin)
- Danny Rose, Mitch Rose (brother)
- Jimmy Ruffell, Bill Ruffell (brother)

=== S ===
- John Salako, (Nigeria) Andy Salako (brother)
- Tommy Sampy, Bill Sampy (brother)
- (Trinidad and Tobago) Jlloyd Samuel, (Note: Was born in Trinidad and Tobago, capped by England at youth levels before switching allegiance to Trinidad and Tobago.) Lakyle Samuel (son)
- (Jamaica) Odin Samuels-Smith, Ishé Samuels-Smith (twin brother)
- Kenny Sansom, Dave Sansom (brother)
- Roy Saunders, (Wales) Dean Saunders (son)
- Tony Sealy, (Hong Kong) Jack Sealy (son)
- Teddy Sheringham, Charlie Sheringham (son)
- Peter Shilton, Sam Shilton (son)
- Guy Shuttleworth, Ben Chilwell (grandson)
- Charlie Sillett, Peter Sillett (son), John Sillett (son of Charlie; brother of Peter)
- (Jamaica) Frank Sinclair, (Note: Was born in England but represented Jamaica internationally.) Tyrese Sinclair (son)
- Martin Sinclair, Scott Sinclair (brother), Jake Sinclair (brother)
- Jack Smith, Tom Smith (brother), Billy Smith (brother), Joe Smith (brother), Sep Smith (brother)
- Lewwis Spence, (Jamaica) Drew Spence (Note: Was born in England, played one senior international match for England before switching allegiance to Jamaica.) (sister)
- Georgia Stanway, Wyll Stanway (brother)
- Brian Stein, (Note: Was born in South Africa but represented England internationally.) Mark Stein (brother), Ed Stein (brother)
- Dennis Stevens, Duncan Edwards (cousin)
- Alan Stubbs, Sam Stubbs (son)
- Simon Sturridge, Dean Sturridge (brother), Daniel Sturridge (nephew)
- George Summerbee, Gordon Summerbee (brother), Mike Summerbee (son), Nicky Summerbee (grandson of George/son of Mike)
- Mike Sutton, Chris Sutton (son), John Sutton (son)

=== T ===
- Harry Taylor, (Republic of Ireland) Jack Taylor (brother)
- Paul Taylor, Robert Taylor (son)
- Paul Terry, John Terry (brother), Paul Konchesky (brother-in-law), Frankie Terry (son of Paul Terry; nephew of John Terry and Paul Konchesky)
- Alan Thompson, Sean Longstaff (first cousin once removed), Matty Longstaff (first cousin once removed)
- Colin Todd, Andy Todd (son).
- Don Townsend, Andy Townsend (son)
- Millie Turner, Jake Turner (brother)

=== V ===
- Darius Vassell, Isaac Vassell (cousin)
- Stephen Vaughan Sr., Stephen Vaughan Jr. (son)

=== W ===
- Alan Waddle, Chris Waddle (cousin)
- Des Walker, Tyler Walker (son), Lewis Walker (son)
- (Wales) Mike Walker, Ian Walker (son)
- Danny Wallace, Ray Wallace (brother), Rod Wallace (brother)
- Mark Walters, (Jamaica) Simon Ford (nephew)
- Richie Wellens, Charlie Wellens (son)
- Scott Wharton, Adam Wharton (brother)
- Dave Whelan, David Sharpe (grandson)
- George Wilkins, Graham Wilkins (son), Ray Wilkins (son), Stephen Wilkins (son), Dean Wilkins (son)
- (Montserrat) Matty Willock, Chris Willock, Joe Willock (brothers)
- (Scotland) Andy Wilson, Jimmy Wilson (son)
- Clive Wilson, (Jamaica) Siobhan Wilson (daughter)
- (Scotland) Hughie Wilson, Jock Wilson (son) (Note: Jock Wilson was born in England while his father played there and was only eligible for England under rules of the time, but played all his football in Scotland.)
- Dennis Wise, Henry Wise (son)
- Ian Wright (father), Shaun Wright-Phillips (son), Bradley Wright-Phillips (son), (Grenada) D'Margio Wright-Phillips (Note: Was born in England, capped by England's under-16 and under-17 sides before switching allegiance to Grenada.) (grandson/Shaun's son) Jermaine Wright (cousin), Drey Wright, Diaz Wright (cousins/Jermaine's sons)
- (Scotland) Jocky Wright, Billy Wright (son), Doug Wright (son)

=== Y ===
- Ashley Young, Lewis Young (brother), Tyler Young (son)

== See also ==
- List of professional sports families
- List of family relations in American football
  - List of second-generation National Football League players
- List of association football (soccer) families
  - List of African association football families
  - List of European association football families
    - List of former Yugoslavia association football families
    - List of Scottish football families
    - List of Spanish association football families
  - Category:Association football families
- List of Australian rules football families
- List of second-generation Major League Baseball players
- List of second-generation National Basketball Association players
- List of boxing families
- List of chess families
- List of International cricket families
- List of family relations in the National Hockey League
- List of family relations in rugby league
- List of international rugby union families
- List of professional wrestling families
