= Anthony Handrickan =

Australian cricketer

Personal information
- Full name: Anthony John Handrickan
- Born: 6 January 1959 (age 67); Largs Bay, South Australia
- Batting: Right-handed
- Role: Batsman

Domestic team information
- Years: Team
- 1976/77–1983/84: South Australia

Career statistics
Competition	First-class	List A
Matches	8	2
Runs scored	448	0
Batting average	29.86	0.00
100s/50s	1/2	–/–
Top score	113	0
Balls bowled	–	–
Wickets	–	–
Bowling average	–	–
5 wickets in innings	–	–
10 wickets in match	–	–
Best bowling	–	–
Catches/stumpings	6/–	–/–
- Source: Cricinfo, 6 August 2020

Anthony John Handrickan (born 6 January 1959) is a former Australian cricketer. He played in eight first-class matches and two limited overs matches for South Australia between 1976 and 1983.

A leading junior cricketer, Handrickan was already playing senior cricket for Port Adelaide Cricket Club in South Australian district cricket while attending Woodville High School when he represented the South Australian Colts team in the 1976/77 Interstate Colts Carnival. He won the W.H. Hayes Trophy for the South Australian player with the best Carnival batting aggregate (152 runs), including an innings of 108 against Western Australia.

== First-class career ==
A successful Adelaide district cricket debut season, which saw Handrickan score 268 runs at 38, topping Port Adelaide's seasonal average, led to Handrickan making his first-class debut for South Australia on 11 February 1977, against Queensland at the Adelaide Oval, scoring two and 21. It was enough to maintain his place for South Australia's next match, starting 18 February 1977 against New South Wales at the Adelaide Oval, where aged 18 years and 43 days, Handrickan scored 113. At the time, Handrickan was the sixth youngest Australian cricketer to score a first-class century, behind Archie Jackson, Ian Craig, Doug Walters, Clem Hill and Frederick Fontaine.

In mid-1977 Handrickan was chosen in the Australian Youth squad to tour England, playing in two Youth Test matches against England Young Cricketers, scoring five and 56. Overall, Handrickan scored 360 runs on tour at an average of 36.00, behind only future Australian Test cricketer Geoff Marsh, and Youth Team captain Braddon Green, and ahead of future Australian Test cricketers David Boon and Wayne Phillips.

The absence of World Series Cricket players from the South Australian side in 1977/78 gave Handrickan more opportunity to play, including against the touring Indian team on 4 November 1977.

On 9 December 1977, aged 18 years and 334 days, Handrickan became the youngest player to represent South Australia in a Sheffield Shield match at the Melbourne Cricket Ground (MCG), when he scored nine and 93 against Victoria.

The 1977/78 season also saw Handrickan make his List A debut for South Australia, in a Gillette Cup match against Tasmania at Bellerive Oval, Hobart on 15 January 1978, scoring a duck.

Following the 1977/78 season HAndrickan looked set for a long first-class career but badly injured his knee at a Port Adelaide training session and missed the entire 1978/79 Australian cricket season.

Handrickan took a while to fully recover from his injury but by 1982 was due to return to first-class cricket when he chosen in the South Australian squad to face Western Australia, but was sacked by selectors after a drunken incident at the Adelaide Oval Test, for which he pled guilty to charges of using offensive language, resisting arrest and refusing to give his name and address to police.

Handrickan made a final appearance for South Australia on 16 October 1983, in the McDonalds Cup limited overs match against Western Australia at the WACA Ground, scoring a seven ball duck.

== Honours ==
In 2013 Handrickan was named in Port Adelaide Cricket Club's "Team of the Ages”, while in 2019 Adelaide newspaper Westside Weekly/Portside Weekly Messenger named Handrickan as an opener in Woodville High School's Greatest Ever XI.

== See also ==
- List of South Australian representative cricketers

== Sources ==
- Page, R. (1984) South Australian Cricketers 1877-1984, Association of Cricket Statisticians and Historians: Retford, Nottinghamshire.
- South Australian Cricket Association (SACA) (1977) Year Book 1976-77, Adelaide.
- South Australian Cricket Association (SACA) (1979) Year Book 1978-79, Adelaide.
