= Sid Hird =

Australian cricketer

Personal information
- Full name: Sydney Frederick Hird
- Born: 10 January 1910; Balmain, Sydney, New South Wales, Australia
- Died: 20 December 1980 (aged 70); Bloemfontein, Orange Free State, South Africa
- Batting: Right-handed
- Bowling: Right-arm leg-spin; Right-arm off-spin

Domestic team information
- Years: Team
- 1931/32–1932/33: New South Wales
- 1939: Lancashire
- 1945/46–1948/49: Eastern Province
- 1950/51: Border

Career statistics
Competition	First-class
Matches	32
Runs scored	1,453
Batting average	33.02
100s/50s	5/4
Top score	130
Balls bowled
Wickets	59
Bowling average	28.54
5 wickets in innings	3
10 wickets in match	0
Best bowling	6/56
Catches/stumpings	8/–
- Source: Cricinfo, 23 April 2018

Sydney Frederick Hird (7 January 1910 – 20 December 1980) was an Australian cricketer who played first-class cricket from 1931 to 1951, for New South Wales, Lancashire, Eastern Province and Border. He was born in the Sydney suburb of Balmain and died in Bloemfontein, Orange Free State.

Hird was educated at Rozelle Junior Technical School in Sydney, where his classmates included the future Test cricket players Archie Jackson and Bill Hunt. He appeared in 32 first-class matches as a right-handed batsman who bowled right arm leg spin and off spin. He scored 1,453 runs with a highest score of 130, one of five first-class centuries, and held eight catches. He took 59 wickets with a best analysis of six for 56.

In the 1930s, unable to find employment in Australia, Hird moved to England, where he played as the professional for Ramsbottom in the Lancashire League from 1933 to 1939. He moved to South Africa after the Second World War and captained Eastern Province. In the 1946–47 Currie Cup, when Border needed just 42 in their second innings to defeat Eastern Province, Hird and Steytler Thwaits bowled them out for 34, Hird taking 5 for 16 (match figures of 34–14–39–9).

Hird was later a successful coach in Eastern Province and Orange Free State.

Hird's first marriage ended in divorce in England in 1937. He married again in Grahamstown, South Africa, in 1948, where he worked as a hotelier. He died in Bloemfontein in 1980, aged 70.
