= Cyril Parry =

Cyril Parry is the name of:

- Cyril Parry (cricketer) (1900–1984), Australian cricketer
- Cyril Parry (footballer) (1937–2024), English footballer
