= Andy Jackson (footballer, born 1890) =

Scottish footballer

Personal information
- Full name: Thomas Andrew Jackson
- Date of birth: 4 February 1890
- Place of birth: Cambuslang, Scotland
- Date of death: 30 September 1918 (aged 28)
- Place of death: Watten, France
- Position: Centre half

Senior career*
Years	Team	Apps	(Gls)
–1909	Ardrossan Winton Rovers		
1909–1917	Middlesbrough	123	(3)
1916	→ St Mirren (guest)	2	(0)
1916–1917	→ Aberdeen (guest)	10	(2)
- * Club domestic league appearances and goals

Thomas Andrew Jackson (4 February 1890 – 30 September 1918) was a Scottish professional footballer who played as a centre half in the Football League for Middlesbrough. He also played in the Scottish League for Aberdeen and St Mirren.

== Personal life ==
Jackson was a member of a sporting family: his father Andrew was capped for Scotland in the 1880s and his uncle Jimmy and cousins James and Archie all played in the Football League. A younger cousin Archie Jackson was a prominent Australian cricketer. Prior to becoming a professional footballer, Jackson worked as an apprentice moulder for Fullerton, Hodgart & Barclay in Paisley.

In November 1915, 18 months after the outbreak of the First World War, he enlisted in the Lovat Scouts, shortly afterwards being transferred to the Queen's Own Cameron Highlanders and rising to the rank of sergeant in that unit. Jackson was wounded during the Hundred Days Offensive in late 1918 and died of his wounds at 36th Casualty Clearing Station, Watten on 30 September 1918. He was buried in the Haringhe (Bandaghem) Military Cemetery, Belgium.

== Career statistics ==
Appearances and goals by club, season and competition
Club	Season	League			National Cup		Total	
Club	Season	Division	Apps	Goals	Apps	Goals	Apps	Goals
Middlesbrough	1910–11	First Division	28	0	4	0	32	0
Middlesbrough	1911–12	First Division	18	1	4	0	22	1
Middlesbrough	1912–13	First Division	20	0	4	0	24	0
Middlesbrough	1913–14	First Division	28	0	1	0	29	0
Middlesbrough	1914–15	First Division	29	2	1	0	30	2
Middlesbrough	Total		123	3	14	0	137	3
St Mirren	1915–16	Scottish Division One	2	0	—		2	0
Aberdeen	1916–17	Scottish Division One	10	2	—		10	2
Career total			135	5	14	0	149	5
