= Steytler Thwaits =

South African cricketer (1911–1980)

Personal information
- Full name: Steytler Abbott Thwaits
- Born: 27 November 1910; Cape Town, South Africa
- Died: 13 October 1980 (aged 69); Port Elizabeth, South Africa
- Batting: Right-handed
- Bowling: Slow left-arm orthodox

Domestic team information
- Years: Team
- 1939/40–1947/48: Eastern Province
- 1949/50–1954/55: Western Province

Career statistics
Competition	First-class
Matches	41
Runs scored	724
Batting average	16.08
100s/50s	1/1
Top score	147
Balls bowled	11,651
Wickets	136
Bowling average	23.59
5 wickets in innings	6
10 wickets in match	0
Best bowling	8/43
Catches/stumpings	20/–
- Source: Cricinfo, 31 July 2025

Steytler Abbott Thwaits (27 November 1910 – 13 October 1980) was a South African cricketer. He played in 41 first-class matches for Eastern Province and Western Province between 1939–40 and 1954–55.

Thwaits was a slow left-arm orthodox bowler and useful lower-order batsman. His best first-class bowling figures were 8 for 43 for Eastern Province against Orange Free State in the 1939–40 season. In the 1946–47 Currie Cup, also against Orange Free State, he made his only century, scoring 147 batting at number six. Later that season, when Border needed just 42 in their second innings to defeat Eastern Province, Thwaites and Sid Hird bowled them out for 34, Thwaites taking 4 for 13.

Thwaits played his last match of first-class cricket in the 1954–55 season when he was 44, taking 5 for 57 and 4 for 67 for Western Province against Natal in the Currie Cup.

Thwaits worked as a schoolteacher. He died in Port Elizabeth in 1980, aged 69.
