= Cyril Oxley =

English footballer

Cyril Oxley (2 May 1904 – 20 December 1984) was an English footballer who played as a midfielder for Liverpool in the Football League. Oxley signed for Liverpool from Chesterfield in 1925. He played 31 matches during the 1925–26 season, in what was to be his only season at the club.

Born in Whitwell, Derbyshire, Oxley was the older brother of fellow footballer and Chesterfield and Sheffield United player Bernard.
