= Andrew Jackson (footballer) =

Scottish footballer

Personal information
- Full name: Andrew Jackson
- Date of birth: 26 April 1856
- Place of birth: Airdrie, Scotland
- Date of death: 3 December 1930 (aged 74)
- Place of death: Paisley, Scotland
- Positions: Full back; half back

Senior career*
Years	Team	Apps	(Gls)
1876–1891	Cambuslang	13	(1)

International career
1886–1888	Scotland	2	(0)
- * Club domestic league appearances and goals

Andrew Jackson (26 April 1856 – 3 December 1930) was a Scottish footballer who played as a full back or half back.

== Career ==
Born in Airdrie, Jackson lived in Cambuslang for most of his life and played club football for Cambuslang, leading them to the 1888 Scottish Cup Final as captain, winning the Lanarkshire Cup and Glasgow Cup, and taking part in the inaugural season of the Scottish Football League in 1890. He retired the following year and was granted a benefit match with Cambuslang taking on a Scottish League XI.

He made two appearances for Scotland.

== Personal life ==
His brother Jimmy (20 years younger), son Andy, and nephews James and Archie were also all footballers.
