= Jason Roberts (footballer) =

Footballer (born 1978)

Jason Roberts MBE
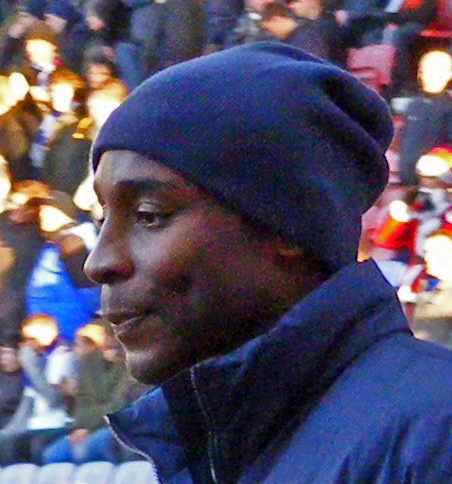
- Roberts warming up for Blackburn Rovers in 2009

Personal information
- Full name: Jason Andre Davis Roberts
- Date of birth: 25 January 1978 (age 48)
- Place of birth: Park Royal, London, England
- Height: 6 ft 1 in (1.85 m)
- Position: Striker

Senior career*
Years	Team	Apps	(Gls)
1995–1997	Hayes	35	(11)
1997–1998	Wolverhampton Wanderers	0	(0)
1997–1998	→ Torquay United (loan)	14	(6)
1998	→ Bristol City (loan)	3	(1)
1998–2000	Bristol Rovers	78	(38)
2000–2004	West Bromwich Albion	89	(24)
2003–2004	→ Portsmouth (loan)	10	(1)
2004–2006	Wigan Athletic	93	(37)
2006–2012	Blackburn Rovers	134	(24)
2012–2014	Reading	28	(6)
Total		484	(148)

International career
1998–2008	Grenada	15	(13)
- * Club domestic league appearances and goals

Jason Andre Davis Roberts MBE (born 25 January 1978) is a former professional footballer who is now Chief Football Development Officer at CONCACAF.

Born in Park Royal, London, Roberts was playing football from an early age, and spent time in the youth academies at several professional clubs, but was not retained. After a spell in non-league football with Hayes, he joined Wolverhampton Wanderers in 1997. He failed to make a first-team appearance for Wolves, and had loan spells at Torquay United and Bristol City before signing for Bristol Rovers in 1998. He quickly established himself in the first team, scoring 38 goals in his two seasons at the club.

After the club failed to gain promotion, Roberts handed in a transfer request and was sold to West Bromwich Albion in July 2000. His goals helped the team reach the First Division play-offs in his first season at the club, then promotion to the Premier League in the following season. Roberts scored three goals in his first Premier League season as the club were relegated back down to the First Division. He was loaned out to Portsmouth at the start of the 2003–04 season, and was then sold to Wigan Athletic in January 2004. He scored 21 goals in Wigan's promotion-winning campaign in the 2004–05 season, and won the club's Player of the Year award at the end of the season. His goals in the following season helped the club finish tenth in its inaugural Premier League campaign, as well as taking them to the 2006 Football League Cup Final at the Millennium Stadium – the club's first ever major cup final.

After failing to agree a new contract with Wigan, he was sold to Blackburn Rovers in 2006, where he played European football for the first time. He made 156 appearances for Blackburn, scoring 28 goals. In 2007, he established the Jason Roberts Foundation, and was awarded an MBE for services to sport in 2010 New Year Honours – Grenada. In 2011, he began working as a presenter for BBC Radio 5 Live's 6-0-6 programme. In January 2012 he signed for Reading on an eighteen-month contract and helped them to promotion from the Football League Championship as champions. On 20 March 2014, he announced his immediate retirement from the game due to persistent injuries.

== Club career ==
=== Early career ===
Roberts was born in Central Middlesex Hospital, north-west London. He grew up in Stonebridge, in the London Borough of Brent. Roberts was born into a sporting family: his uncles Cyrille Regis, Dave Regis and Otis Roberts all had careers as professional footballers, while another uncle, John Regis, is a former Olympic sprinter. He began playing football from the age of six, and was scouted by several professional clubs while playing for Parkfield Youth. He trained at the youth academies of a number of these clubs, including Tottenham Hotspur, Watford, and Chelsea, but failed to earn a contract. He then spent time on trial at Wycombe Wanderers, but was not offered a permanent deal at the club.

After being rejected by Wycombe, Roberts spent more than a year away from football. He began working as an export clerk, and was considering quitting the game altogether. Only when his uncle Cyrille arranged a trial at former club Hayes in the Isthmian League Premier Division Roberts returned to football. He did enough to impress the club and signed a part-time contract worth £15 per week. He made his debut in November 1995, the season Hayes won promotion to the Football Conference. After scoring five goals early in the 1997–98 season, he was sold to Wolverhampton Wanderers for £250,000, before moving to Torquay United on loan, where he scored six goals in 13 games. These goals came as Torquay struggled and won a relegation battle. Another loan took him to Bristol City, where he scored one goal against Oldham in three appearances.

He joined Bristol Rovers for £250,000 in August 1998. In the 1998–99 season, Roberts scored 16 goals in 37 league appearances, and was one of the top goal scorers in the FA Cup with a total of seven goals. He continued his plunder in the next season, scoring 22 goals in 41 appearances. In the summer of 2000 however, following Rovers' failure to gain promotion, he handed in a transfer request to the club.

=== West Bromwich Albion ===
Roberts moved to West Bromwich Albion on 26 July 2000, for a club record £2 million fee. He made his debut in a 1–0 defeat away at Nottingham Forest on 12 August, the opening day of the 2000–01 season. He scored twice against Swansea City in the League Cup on 6 September, his first goals for the club. Roberts scored 17 goals in 50 appearances in 2000–01; he formed a successful partnership with Lee Hughes and took Albion to the First Division playoffs. During the successful promotion campaign of 2001–02 however, his season was blighted by a persistent foot injury, breaking his fifth metatarsal three times. He managed 14 league appearances during the season, scoring seven goals.

Despite being fully fit for 2002–03, Albion's first season in the Premier League, Roberts managed only three goals in 32 games. He was loaned out for much of the 2003–04 season to Portsmouth, where he scored once against Everton, with three further goals in the League Cup against Northampton Town (2) and Nottingham Forest. A transfer request during mid-season saw him move to Wigan Athletic for a fee of £1.4 million, potentially rising to £2 million.

=== Wigan Athletic ===
Roberts made his debut for Wigan on 17 January 2004 in a 4–2 win against Preston North End, scoring his first goal for the club inside the first 35 seconds of the match. He made a good start to his career at the club, scoring eight goals in 14 appearances to round out the 2003–04 season. Roberts continued to find the net in the 2004–05 campaign, ending the season with 21 goals in league play—second in The Championship, behind teammate Nathan Ellington. Both players were named in the PFA Championship team of the season. Wigan finished second in the table behind Sunderland, earning automatic promotion to the Premier League. It was his penalty kick goal in the second minute of their 27 August 2005 match against Sunderland that served as the first Premier League goal for the Latics and led them to the first top-flight victory in Wigan Athletic's history.

With Wigan Athletic's promotion to the top flight of English football in May 2005, Jason Roberts was able to establish himself in the Premier League. His goals enabled Wigan to finish the season comfortably in the top half and challenge for a European place in only their first season in the top division of English football. This success was encapsulated in one moment on 24 January 2006—when Roberts himself scored a last minute goal against Arsenal at Highbury in the League Cup semi-final to send Wigan to the first major cup final in their history. He would go on to start for Wigan in the final against Manchester United.

=== Blackburn Rovers ===
On 3 July 2006, he joined Blackburn Rovers on a four-year contract for an undisclosed fee. He scored his first goal for Blackburn in the 2–1 FA Cup semi-final defeat against Chelsea, he missed three months of the season with a broken foot. Roberts kept this momentum towards the end of the 2006–07 season by netting five goals in as many games.

The following season, he struggled to maintain a place in the Blackburn starting line up due to the signing of Bayern Munich striker Roque Santa Cruz. However, after a solo goal at rivals Bolton Wanderers, he claimed back his place and took part in many games towards the end of the season netting some goals and forging a good partnership with Santa Cruz.

Roberts scored seven league goals in the 2008–09 season, as Blackburn struggled in the league finishing 15th. He signed a new deal in November 2008 which kept him at Ewood Park until the summer of 2011. By the end of the 2009–10 season, Roberts had scored five goals in 31 appearances, helping Blackburn finish 10th in the league.

=== Reading ===
On 26 January 2012, Roberts signed for Reading on an eighteen-month contract. Roberts scored on his debut against Bristol City on 26 January 2012; when David James saved his penalty and Roberts bundled the ball over the line from the rebound. His second goal came on 11 February against Coventry City, where he deflected in a Matthew Connolly header. He scored his third goal in four starts in a 1–0 win against Burnley, after looping a Jobi McAnuff cross over keeper Lee Grant. On 10 March, Roberts got on the scoresheet again with a goal from close in to the bottom left corner of the goal, against Leicester City, in a 3–1 win. Reading's matchday edition of the Royals, revealed that Roberts had officially made the best ever start to a Reading career by helping them achieve an eight-game winning run, while also scoring four times and providing five assists. He scored his sixth goal for Reading in an important top of the table clash against Southampton, connecting with Jimmy Kébé's pinpoint cross.

On 21 February 2014, having not played for more than a year due to a persistent hip injury, Roberts told the matchday announcer he was unlikely to play again and on 20 March 2014 he announced his retirement from football.

== International career ==
With Grenada national team, Roberts scored in qualifiers for the 2006 World Cup against the United States.

Roberts scored the first two goals of a 10–0 rout of the US Virgin Islands on 26 March 2008, in the first game of 2010 FIFA World Cup qualification.

Roberts qualified to play for Grenada through his father, who was born there. His mother was born in French Guiana.

== Media career ==
In Wigan's first season in the Premier League, Roberts wrote a weekly blog for the BBC Sport's website. In August 2011 he was announced as a new presenter on 6-0-6 and made his first appearance on Match of the Day 2 in November 2011. He appeared on Match of the Day 2 for the second time on 15 January 2012, the third time on 1 April and a fourth on 11 November. He worked as a co-commentator at the 2014 FIFA World Cup for 5 Live and joined the BBC full-time at the start of the 2014–2015 season to work as a pundit and co-commentator.

== Post-playing career ==
Jason Roberts was named Concacaf Director of Development in November 2017. He is a member of the FIFA Players' Status Committee and is based in Miami, Florida.

== Personal life ==
Roberts is a fan of Celtic and supported them growing up.

In Spring 2007, he founded the Jason Roberts Foundation, which aims "to provide a range of sporting opportunities for children and young people in the UK and Grenada".

Roberts comes from a prominent sporting family: his uncles include former footballers Cyrille Regis, Dave Regis, and Otis Roberts (a former Grenada international who played in Hong Kong and Belgium). He is also related to Olympic medallist John Regis, who was Cyrille's cousin.

Roberts was appointed Member of the Order of the British Empire (MBE) in the 2010 New Year Honours list, for his services to sport in Grenada and in London, England. Upon receiving the award he stated in one of Blackburn's match-day programme notes that he was humbled to get it and thanks everyone who has supported his charity work.

== Career statistics ==
=== Club ===
Appearances and goals by club, season and competition
Club	Season	League			FA Cup		League Cup		Europe		Other		Total	
Club	Season	Division	Apps	Goals	Apps	Goals	Apps	Goals	Apps	Goals	Apps	Goals	Apps	Goals
Hayes	1995–96	Isthmian League Premier Division	0	0	0	0	—		—		5 (Note: Four appearances and one goal in Middlesex Senior Cup, one appearance in FA Trophy)	1	5	1
Hayes	1996–97	Football Conference	28	6	2	0	—		—		8 (Note: Four appearances and one goal in FA Trophy, two appearances and three goals in Middlesex Senior Cup, one appearance in Conference League Cup, one appearance in Isthmian League Charity Shield)	4	38	10
Hayes	1997–98	Football Conference	7	5	—		—		—		—		7	5
Hayes	Total		35	11	2	0	—		—		13	5	50	16
Torquay United (loan)	1997–98	Third Division	14	6	—		—		—		1 (Note: Appearance(s) in Football League Trophy)	0	15	6
Bristol City (loan)	1997–98	Second Division	3	1	—		—		—		—		3	1
Bristol Rovers	1998–99	Second Division	37	16	5	7	2	0	—		1	0	45	23
Bristol Rovers	1999–2000	Second Division	41	22	1	0	4	3	—		2	0	48	25
Bristol Rovers	Total		78	38	6	7	6	3	—		3	0	93	48
West Bromwich Albion	2000–01	First Division	43	14	1	0	4	2	—		2 (Note: Appearances in First Division play-offs)	1	50	17
West Bromwich Albion	2001–02	First Division	14	7	3	0	0	0	—		—		17	7
West Bromwich Albion	2002–03	Premier League	32	3	2	0	0	0	—		—		34	3
West Bromwich Albion	Total		89	24	6	0	4	2	—		2	1	101	27
Portsmouth (loan)	2003–04	Premier League	10	1	0	0	2	3	—		—		12	4
Wigan Athletic	2003–04	First Division	14	8	—		—		—		—		14	8
Wigan Athletic	2004–05	Championship	45	21	1	0	0	0	—		—		46	21
Wigan Athletic	2005–06	Premier League	34	8	3	2	6	4	—		—		43	14
Wigan Athletic	Total		93	37	4	2	6	4	—		—		103	43
Blackburn Rovers	2006–07	Premier League	18	4	3	1	1	0	3 (Note: Appearances in UEFA Cup)	0	—		25	5
Blackburn Rovers	2007–08	Premier League	26	3	0	0	1	0	4 (Note: Two appearances and one goal in Intertoto Cup, two appearances and one goal in UEFA Cup)	2	—		31	5
Blackburn Rovers	2008–09	Premier League	26	7	4	0	0	0	—		—		30	7
Blackburn Rovers	2009–10	Premier League	29	5	0	0	2	0	—		—		31	5
Blackburn Rovers	2010–11	Premier League	25	5	2	0	0	0	—		—		27	5
Blackburn Rovers	2011–12	Premier League	10	0	0	0	2	1	—		—		12	1
Blackburn Rovers	Total		134	24	9	1	6	1	7	2	—		156	28
Reading	2011–12	Championship	17	6	—		—		—		—		17	6
Reading	2012–13	Premier League	11	0	0	0	1	1	—		—		12	1
Reading	2013–14	Championship	0	0	0	0	0	0	—		—		0	0
Reading	Total		28	6	0	0	1	1	—		—		29	7
Career total			484	148	27	10	25	14	7	2	19	6	562	180

=== International ===
Appearances and goals by national team and year
National team	Year	Apps	Goals
Grenada	1998	2	4
Grenada	1999	3	2
Grenada	2000	2	0
Grenada	2001	0	0
Grenada	2002	0	0
Grenada	2003	0	0
Grenada	2004	5	4
Grenada	2005	0	0
Grenada	2006	0	0
Grenada	2007	0	0
Grenada	2008	4	4
Total		16	14

Scores and results list Grenada's goal tally first, score column indicates score after each Roberts goal.

List of international goals scored by Jason Roberts
No.	Date	Venue	Opponent	Score	Result	Competition
1	15 April 1998	Antigua Recreation Ground, St. John's	Anguilla	1–0	14–1	1998 Caribbean Cup
2	15 April 1998	Antigua Recreation Ground, St. John's	Anguilla	8–0	14–1	1998 Caribbean Cup
3	15 April 1998	Antigua Recreation Ground, St. John's	Anguilla	12–0	14–1	1998 Caribbean Cup
4	18 April 1998	Antigua Recreation Ground, St. John's	Guyana	1–0	2–1	1998 Caribbean Cup
5	3 June 1999	Hasely Crawford Stadium, Port of Spain	Guadeloupe		2–1	1999 Caribbean Cup
6	7 June 1999	Hasely Crawford Stadium, Port of Spain	Jamaica	1–0	1–2	1999 Caribbean Cup
7	14 March 2004	Blairmont Community Centre, Blairmont	Guyana	2–1	3–1	2006 World Cup qualifier
8	20 May 2004	Estadio Pedro Marrero, Havana	Cuba	1–2	2–2	Friendly
9	2 June 2004	Tanteen Recreation Ground, St. George's	Saint Lucia	1–0	2–0	Friendly
10	20 June 2004	Grenada National Stadium, St. George's	United States	1–1	2–3	2006 World Cup qualifier
11	26 March 2008	Grenada National Stadium, St. George's	U.S. Virgin Islands	1–0	10–0	2010 World Cup qualifier
12	26 March 2008	Grenada National Stadium, St. George's	U.S. Virgin Islands	2–0	10–0	2010 World Cup qualifier
13	10 June 2008	Grenada National Stadium, St. George's	Jamaica	2–1	2–1	Friendly
14	14 June 2008	Grenada National Stadium, St. George's	Costa Rica	2–0	2–2	2010 World Cup qualifier

== Honours ==
Wigan Athletic

- Football League Cup runner-up: 2005–06

Reading

- Football League Championship: 2011–12

Individual

- PFA Team of the Year: 1999–2000 Second Division, 2004–05 Football League Championship
