= Jack Smith (footballer, born 1898) =

English footballer

Personal information
- Full name: John William Smith
- Date of birth: 28 October 1898
- Place of birth: Whitburn, County Durham, England
- Date of death: 19 January 1977 (aged 78)
- Height: 5 ft 7 in (1.70 m)
- Position: Inside right

Senior career*
Years	Team	Apps	(Gls)
- North Shields Athletic
1919–1927	South Shields	264	(84)
1927–1934	Portsmouth	261	(61)
1934–1936	Bournemouth & Boscombe Athletic	41	(2)
1936–1937	Clapton Orient	5	(0)

International career
1931	England	3	(4)
- * Club domestic league appearances and goals

John William Smith, known as Jack Smith (28 October 1898 – 19 January 1977) was an English international footballer, who played as an inside-right.

== Career ==
Born in Whitburn, Smith played for North Shields Athletic, before moving to South Shields, where he made 264 League appearances in eight seasons. He went on to join Portsmouth and played in the 1934 FA Cup Final side that lost to Manchester City in April 1934.

He earned three caps for England in 1931.

Four of his six brothers were also footballers. Billy also played for South Shields and Portsmouth and the two played together in the 1934 Cup Final. Sep played for Leicester City, and played against his brothers in the semi-final of the competition. Tom played for South Shields and later played for Manchester United and Northampton Town. Joe played reserve football for Leicester and later played for Watford.

== Honours ==
Portsmouth

- FA Cup runner-up: 1928–29, 1933–34
