= Joe Smith (footballer, born 1908) =

English footballer

Personal information
- Full name: Joseph Kirby Smith
- Date of birth: 11 June 1908
- Place of birth: Whitburn, County Durham, England
- Date of death: 1993 (aged 84–85)
- Position: Left-back

Senior career*
Years	Team	Apps	(Gls)
- Whitburn
1929–1930	Leicester City	0	(0)
1930–1931	Watford	1	(0)
- Market Harborough Town
- Bentley Engineering
- * Club domestic league appearances and goals

Joseph Kirby Smith (11 June 1908 – 1993) was an English footballer who played as a left-back in the Football League for Watford.

Smith played reserve football for Leicester City and later played for Watford, making his only Third Division South appearance in the final game of the 1930–31 season.

He later played football and cricket for Bentley Engineering, captaining both teams, and played amateur football in Leicester.

Four of his six brothers were also footballers. Billy and Jack played for South Shields and played in the 1934 FA Cup Final together for Portsmouth. Sep also played for Leicester City, Tom played for South Shields, and later for Manchester United and Northampton Town.
