= Tom Smith (footballer, born 1900) =

English footballer

Personal information
- Full name: Thomas Gable Smith
- Date of birth: 18 October 1900
- Place of birth: Whitburn, County Durham, England
- Date of death: 21 February 1934 (aged 33)
- Height: 5 ft 8 in (1.73 m)
- Positions: Inside right; outside right

Senior career*
Years	Team	Apps	(Gls)
- Marsden Villa
- Whitburn
1919	South Shields	8	(1)
1919–1923	Leicester City	72	(12)
1923–1927	Manchester United	83	(12)
1927–1930	Northampton Town	112	(22)
1930	Norwich City	1	(0)
- Whitburn
Total		276	(47)
- * Club domestic league appearances and goals

Thomas Gable Smith (18 October 1900 – 21 February 1934) was an English footballer who played as an inside right or outside right in the Football League for South Shields, Leicester City, Manchester United, Northampton Town and Norwich City.

Smith, known as Tosher, played for Marsden Villa and Whitburn before moving to South Shields in 1919. He went on to spend four seasons at Manchester United and three at Northampton Town.

Four of his six brothers were also footballers. Billy and Jack both played for South Shields and played in 1934 FA Cup Final together for Portsmouth. Sep later played for Leicester City, and Joe played reserve football for Leicester and later played for Watford.
