= Jimmy Jackson (footballer, born 1875) =

Footballer (1875–?)

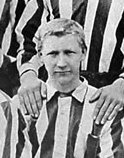
- Jackson in 1897

Personal information
- Full name: James Jackson
- Date of birth: 15 September 1875
- Place of birth: Cambuslang, Lanarkshire, Scotland
- Positions: Wing-half; full-back

Senior career*
Years	Team	Apps	(Gls)
1889–1891	Hamilton Athletic (Note: Many sources incorrectly list the Scottish club Hamilton Academical rather than the Australian Hamilton Athletic before Adamstown Rosebud.)		
1891–1892	Adamstown Rosebud		
- Newton Thistle
- Cambuslang
1896–1897	Rangers	1	(0)
1897–1899	Newcastle United	58	(0)
1899–1905	Woolwich Arsenal	183	(0)
1905	Leyton		
1905–1906	West Ham United	24	(0)
1906–1908	Rangers	30	(0)
1908–1910	Port Glasgow Athletic	53	(1)
1910	Hamilton Academical	8	(0)
1910–1911	Morton	22	(0)
1911–1915	Abercorn	62	(2)
- * Club domestic league appearances and goals

James Jackson (15 September 1875 – after 1914) was a footballer who played as a full back or at wing half.

Jackson's family emigrated from Scotland to Australia where he was raised and where he began his senior football career while still in his early teens. Australian football was still forming and Jackson played for teams from mining areas such as South New Lambton, before being recorded as playing for both Hamilton and Adamstown Rosebud. He returned to Scotland in 1893, appearing in Junior football and briefly for Rangers before moving to England to join Newcastle United. Two years later he signed for Woolwich Arsenal where he spent six seasons, captaining the club in its inaugural season in the Football League First Division. After a short spell as player-manager of Leyton and five months with West Ham United of the Southern League, he rejoined Rangers for two seasons. He ended his career with spells at four more Scottish League clubs: Port Glasgow Athletic, Hamilton Academical, Morton and Abercorn.

== Life and career ==
Jackson was born in Cambuslang, Lanarkshire, Scotland, but his family emigrated to Australia when he was two. The young Jackson grew up in New South Wales and played football as a youth. He is believed to be the youngest player to have appeared in senior football in that country, having played for Hamilton Athletic in 1889 at the age of 13 years 7 months. He remained with Hamilton for the 1890 season, then in 1891 he moved on to Adamstown Rosebud.

Jackson returned to Scotland in 1893. He played Junior football for Newton Thistle and Cambuslang, and then signed for Rangers in 1896, but appeared only once in their Scottish League team.

He was sold to Newcastle United in May 1897, and played for the Magpies for two seasons, helping them achieve promotion to the Football League First Division in 1897–98.

In 1899 he joined Woolwich Arsenal, attracted by the club's willingness to help him open a sports shop. He made his debut against Leicester Fosse on 2 September 1899, and for the next six seasons he was a regular at the club, playing either at left back or wing half. He was a virtual ever-present in the Gunners' 1903–04 promotion-winning season, and captained the club in its inaugural First Division campaign. In all he played 204 League and FA Cup matches for Arsenal, scoring one goal. He came closest to international recognition while with Arsenal, playing in the March 1905 edition of the Home Scots v Anglo-Scots annual trial match.

Jackson left Arsenal in 1905 to become player-manager of Leyton, newly admitted to the Southern League, but his spell was brief. In November of that year he signed for West Ham United, for whom he was ever-present for the rest of their 1905–06 Southern League season, before rejoining Rangers in 1906.

He played in 30 League matches over two seasons at Rangers, (Note: The Fitbastats website mistakenly attributes to Jackson two Scottish League appearances at outside left for Rangers after he left the club. On the dates of the matches concerned, the same site correctly shows Jackson playing for Port Glasgow Athletic. Those matches were played by another James Jackson, an outside left who signed for Rangers on amateur forms from Dundee in May 1908.) before signing for another First Division club, Port Glasgow Athletic, at the start of the 1908–09 season. In January 1910, Jackson refused to play in a Scottish Cup tie because he was claimed he was owed considerable arrears of wages, of some £21; the club duly fined him £20 and suspended him to the end of the season. The Scottish Football Association ruled in Jackson's favour as to wages due up until his refusal to play, but confirmed the club fine. He joined Hamilton Academical for what remained of the season.

In May 1910, he signed for Greenock Morton, for whom he played in 22 of their 34 First Division matches. Early in the following season, he signed for Division Two club Abercorn, and remained with the Paisley club until 1914–15.

== Personal life ==
Jackson's was a sporting family. He had two sons who became footballers: the elder, James, played more than 200 times for Liverpool before being ordained a minister in the Presbyterian Church; the younger, Archie, played for Sunderland and Tranmere Rovers. His brother Andrew (20 years older) was capped for Scotland in the 1880s; Andrew's son Andy played for Middlesbrough before being killed in World War I. Jimmy's nephew was the Australian test cricketer Archie Jackson.
