= James Jackson (footballer, born 1900) =

English footballer (1900–1976)

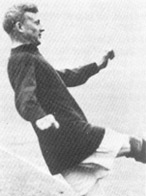

Personal information
- Date of birth: 4 December 1900
- Place of birth: Newcastle, England
- Date of death: c. 1976 (aged 75–76)
- Height: 1.73 m (5 ft 8 in)
- Position: Full-back

Senior career*
Years	Team	Apps	(Gls)
1918–1919	Queen's Park	29	(0)
1919–1923	Motherwell	97	(1)
1923–1925	Aberdeen	67	(2)
1925–1933	Liverpool	212	(2)
Total		405	(5)

International career
1922	Scottish League XI	1	(0)
- * Club domestic league appearances and goals

James Jackson (4 December 1900 – c. 1976) was a footballer who played for Liverpool. Between 1925 and 1933, he made 224 appearances, scoring twice.

== Early life and playing career ==
Born in Newcastle upon Tyne, England to Scottish parents (although his father had grown up in Australia), Jackson played in the Scottish Football League for Queen's Park (one year in the first team), Motherwell (four years) and Aberdeen (two years) before being signed for Liverpool by manager Matt McQueen in May 1925.

He made his debut on 14 November 1925 in a Division 1 match against W.B.A at Anfield in a 2–0 win, and scored the first of his two goals for the club in a 3–1 defeat at the hands of Spurs at White Hart Lane on 17 December 1927.

Predominantly a defender, although he appeared in every outfield position for Liverpool, Jackson became a fixture of the side in the 1928–29 and only missed a couple of games over the next two seasons, racking up 124 appearances in doing so. He became club captain for the Reds and led them with great dignity. He was involved in some physical Merseyside derby matches coming up against the lethal Everton striker Dixie Dean.

Although Jackson was never selected by England (he was ineligible for Scotland under the rules of the time), he represented both the Scottish League and English League representative sides.

== Later and personal life ==
After playing for Liverpool until 1933, he decided to have a complete change of career, becoming a minister in the Presbyterian church; during his spell at Anfield he was nicknamed 'The Parson' because of his religious connections. Before he was ordained as a minister, Jackson found time to attend Cambridge where he read both Philosophy and Greek.

His father Jimmy (Newcastle United and Woolwich Arsenal), younger brother Archie (Sunderland and Tranmere Rovers), uncle Andrew (Cambuslang and Scotland) and cousin Andy (Middlesbrough) were all also footballers. His cousin, also named Archie, was a leading Australian Test cricketer, playing in the same side as Don Bradman.

In his time at Aberdeen there were four Jacksons in the team for a short period (the best known being 'Wembley Wizard' Alex, plus Wattie and Willie) but none were related to James.
