= Bernard Oxley =

English footballer, coach, and manager

Personal information
- Full name: Bernard Oxley
- Date of birth: 16 June 1907
- Place of birth: Whitwell, Derbyshire, England
- Date of death: 7 January 1975 (aged 67)
- Place of death: Worksop, England
- Height: 5 ft 9 in (1.75 m)
- Position: Forward

Youth career
- Whitwell Old Boys

Senior career*
Years	Team	Apps	(Gls)
1925–1928	Chesterfield		
1928–1934	Sheffield United	116	(11)
1934–1935	Sheffield Wednesday		
1935–1936	Plymouth Argyle		
1936–1938	Stockport County		
1938	Worksop Town		
1938–1939	Scunthorpe and Lindsey United		
1946	Wombwell Athletic		

Managerial career
- 1938: Worksop Town (player manager)
- 1939–1940: HVV Den Haag (head coach)
- 1946–1947: Denaby United (coach)
- 1947: Worksop Town
- * Club domestic league appearances and goals

Bernard "Bunny" Oxley (16 June 1907 – 7 January 1975) was an English footballer who played as a forward, before becoming a coach and manager.

== Career ==
Having played for his village team Whitwell Old Boys, Oxley signed amateur terms with Chesterfield as an eighteen-year-old in October 1925. Turning professional the following December, Oxley made his Football League debut at the end of the 1925–26 season he spent two seasons as a first-team player before attracting the attention of Sheffield United. The Blades signed Oxley in May 1928 for £1,350 and initially employed him on the right wing but later selected him in a number of attacking positions. He initially formed a strong partnership with Jack Pickering at the start of the 1929–30 season but an operation for appendicitis saw Oxley miss a large number of games. Eventually returning to the first team Oxley's form was inconsistent and he eventually lost his place in 1932.

Oxley remained at United for two more seasons, mainly playing in the reserves, and was eventually sold to cross-town rivals Sheffield Wednesday for £1,000 in May 1934. Unable to find a regular starting place with his new club Oxley moved again to Plymouth Argyle for £600 in September 1935 and again to Stockport County in June 1936.

Oxley's career was revived at County and he featured regularly, helping the side win the Third Division (North) title in 1936–37 season. Dropping into non-league in 1938, Oxley spent a brief time as player-manager with Worksop Town before signing as player-coach with Scunthorpe and Lindley United in November 1938. In 1939 Oxley moved to The Netherlands to coach football and cricket and was appointed coach at HVV Den Haag but was forced to flee in 1940 following the German invasion.

Returning to England Oxley spent some time playing with Wombwell Athletic before being appointed manager of Worksop Town in 1947 after which he acted as a scout for Leyton Orient.

== Personal life ==
Born in Whitwell, Derbyshire, Oxley was the younger brother of Chesterfield and Liverpool player Cyril Oxley. Returning to England during World War II Oxley worked for the Worksop Fire Service and continued in the role after the end of war.
