= Archie Jackson (footballer) =

English footballer

Personal information
- Full name: Archibald Jackson
- Date of birth: 25 January 1901
- Place of birth: Plumstead, England
- Date of death: 11 November 1985 (aged 84)
- Place of death: Chester, England
- Position: Centre-half

Senior career*
Years	Team	Apps	(Gls)
1921–1922	Rutherglen Glencairn		
1922–1924	Sunderland	6	(0)
1924	Southend United	0	(0)
1924–1925	Third Lanark	1	(0)
1925–1928	Chester		
1928–1930	Tranmere Rovers	37	(0)
1930	Accrington Stanley	6	(0)
1930–1931	Walsall		
1931	Southport		
1931–1932	Northwich Victoria		
1932–1933	Manchester North End		
1935–1936	Rossendale United	46	(1)
- * Club domestic league appearances and goals

Archibald Jackson (25 January 1901 – 11 November 1985) was an English professional footballer who played as a centre-half for Sunderland.

Born in England but raised in Scotland, his father Jimmy, elder brother James, uncle Andrew and cousin Andy were all footballers; another cousin was Australian cricketer Archie Jackson.
