= Frederick Fontaine =

Australian cricketer

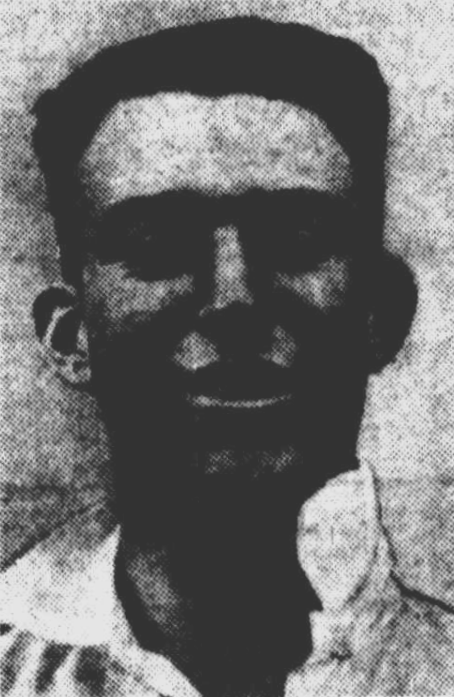

Personal information
- Born: 14 December 1912; Melbourne, Australia
- Died: 24 October 1982 (aged 69); Melbourne, Australia

Domestic team information
- Years: Team
- 1931-1932: Victoria
- Source: Cricinfo, 22 November 2015

Frederick Fontaine (14 December 1912 – 24 October 1982) was an Australian cricketer. He played six first-class cricket matches for Victoria between 1931 and 1932.

== See also ==
- List of Victoria first-class cricketers
