= Otis Roberts =

Association football player (born 1968)

Personal information
- Date of birth: 17 August 1968 (age 58)
- Place of birth: London, England
- Positions: Midfielder; striker

Senior career*
| Years | Team | Apps | (Gls) |
| 1990–1991 | Barnet | | |
| 1991–1995 | Crystal Palace | 0 | (0) |
| 1995–1996 | Golden | | |
| 1996–1997 | Eastern | | |
| 1997–1998 | Gent | | |
| 1998 | FC Hoogstraten | | |
| 1998–2001 | Harrow Borough | | |
| 2001 | Hendon | | |

International career
| 2000 | Grenada | 2 | (0) |
- * Club domestic league appearances and goals

Otis Roberts (born 17 August 1968) is a former professional footballer who played as a midfielder or striker. Born in England, he made two appearances for Grenada national team.

== Club career ==
Roberts played for Barnet during the 1990–91 season.

Roberts played for Crystal Palace from the 1991–92 season, although he never made a first-team league appearance for the club. In August 1996, he began a trial with Norwich City, although that proved unsuccessful. He later played in Hong Kong for Golden and Eastern, and in Belgium for Gent and FC Hoogstraten. He returned to England in 1998 to play for Harrow Borough and Hendon.

== International career ==
Roberts has international caps for Grenada. He made two appearances in 2000.

== Personal life ==
His nephew is fellow footballer Jason Roberts.

== After football ==
Roberts has been a football agent, representing players such as Zesh Rehman. He also runs his nephew Jason Roberts's charitable foundation.
