= Billy Smith (footballer, born 1906) =

English footballer

Personal information
- Full name: William Henry Smith
- Date of birth: 9 June 1906
- Place of birth: Whitburn, County Durham, England
- Date of death: 27 February 1983
- Place of death: Whitburn
- Position: Full-back

Senior career*
Years	Team	Apps	(Gls)
- Whitburn
1924–1925	Tottenham Hotspur	0	(0)
- → Northfleet (loan)
- Whitburn
1926–1928	South Shields	22	(0)
1928–1937	Portsmouth	311	(2)
1937–1940	Stockport County	34	(2)
- * Club domestic league appearances and goals

William Henry Smith (9 June 1906 – 1983) was an English footballer who played as a full-back in the Football League for South Shields, Portsmouth and Stockport County.

Smith, who played in either full-back position, spent the majority of his career at Portsmouth, having previously played League football for South Shields. After joining Portsmouth in 1928, he made 311 League appearances, and played in the 1934 FA Cup Final side that lost to Manchester City in April 1934.

After leaving Portsmouth in 1937, he joined Stockport County, where he played 36 times in four seasons (although his two appearances in 1939–40 were subsequently struck from the record as League football was abandoned due to the outbreak of World War II).

Four of his six brothers were also footballers. Jack also played for South Shields and Portsmouth and the two played together in the 1934 Cup Final. Younger brother Sep played for Leicester City, and played against his brothers in the semi-final of the competition. Tom played for South Shields and later played for Manchester United and Northampton Town. Joe played reserve football for Leicester and later played for Watford.

== Honours ==
Portsmouth

- FA Cup runner-up: 1933–34
