= Ray Parry =

English footballer

Raymond Alan Parry (19 January 1936 – 23 May 2003) was an English footballer.

Parry was born in Derby, Derbyshire and joined Bolton Wanderers in 1951 and made his senior debut against Wolves at Burnden Park after playing six games in the reserves, becoming the youngest player ever to play in the First Division, at the age of 15 years and 267 days. The inside forward was a member of the 1958 FA Cup-winning team and also won two full England caps. He left Bolton in 1960 for Blackpool, and four years later moved to Bury.

His four brothers were also footballers - Jack played for Derby County, Cyril for Notts County, and Reg and Glynn who both played in non-league.

== Honours ==
Bolton Wanderers

- FA Cup: 1957–58
