= Sep Smith =

English footballer

Personal information
- Full name: Septimus Charles Smith
- Date of birth: 15 March 1912
- Place of birth: Whitburn, England
- Date of death: 28 July 2006 (aged 94)
- Height: 5 ft 11 in (1.80 m)
- Position: Right half

Senior career*
Years	Team	Apps	(Gls)
1929–1949	Leicester City	350	(35)

International career
1935	England	1	(0)
- * Club domestic league appearances and goals

Septimus Charle Smith (15 March 1912 – 28 July 2006) was an English footballer who played as a creative wing half and originally as an inside forward. Born in Whitburn, County Durham, in 1912, he was the seventh son born in his family, hence the name Septimus.

He is often considered the best all round player in Leicester City's history and is also the club's longest serving player of all-time having been a player at the club for 19 years and 246 days, as well as captaining the club for 13 years (making him by far the club's longest serving captain).

Smith spent his entire career at Leicester, starting in 1929 and ending in 1949. He made 373 competitive appearances for the Foxes, scoring 37 goals. However, he lost seven seasons of his career because of World War II, during which time he made a further 213 appearances and scored 48 goals during regionalised wartime football. Including these wartime appearances, his tally of 586 appearances makes him Leicester's second top appearance maker of all-time behind Graham Cross.

Smith mentored former Leeds United and England manager Don Revie during his time at Leicester. Revie, who dedicated an entire chapter in his autobiography entitled "What I Owe to Sep Smith" claimed "I'm proud now to think of how much time Sep spent passing on his Soccer knowledge to me. He played a big part in my shaping my career." He also referred to Smith as "an extraordinary footballer," saying "he could place the ball within an inch of a man's toe – [and] that when he lobbed the ball to his winger the opposing full back felt the ball graze his hair as he tried to strain his neck that extra inch, like a drowning man trying to lift his head out of the water."

He was the guest of honour at the Leicester's final game at Filbert Street (the club's home for over 110 years) in April 2002 and a suite at Leicester's current home ground The King Power Stadium is named after him in recognition of his service to the club.

== Club career ==
Smith was signed by Leicester in 1929 by Willie Orr as an inside-forward at the age of 16. where two of his older brothers, Thomas and Joe, were both already playing for Leicester. Tom was a regular in the first-team before moving to Manchester United and Joe was a reserve player who later joined Watford.

He made his debut against Huddersfield Town on 31 August 1929 coming in for Arthur Lochhead who had been suffering from illness, but after a disappointing performance in which the local press described him as being "unable to pull his weight" he played no further part in that season. However, as he began to grow he began to show his poachers instinct, top scoring for the reserves the following season and earning himself a recall to the first team. In 1931–32 he scored 11 times in 22 matches though still as he began to cement his place in the first team.

However, it wasn't until 1932–33, when Smith began to truly blossom after was moved from his role of inside forward and shifted into a deeper role at right half, the position he would make his own for the club for the next 17 years. He helped Leicester to their first ever FA Cup semi-final in 1934 in which came up against two other of his older brothers, Jack and Bill, who were both playing for Leicester's opponents Portsmouth.

He was made club captain two years later in 1936 and won his only honour with the club the following year, winning the Second Division title in 1936–37.

During his time at Leicester, Smith was known to take many young up and coming players under his wing and tutor them, the most notable of these was Don Revie, Smith said of Revie "I could see he had potential when he came down for a trial and I used to coach him lots with the ball. I'd say come on with me, and we'd go into a corner and I'd teach him things. He was an eager young player but I used to make him cry when I told him he did things wrong. He told me he would go home after the match and start to cry. I was pushing him because I believed in him. When he used to cry, I told him he should do things right. But he could cross a ball and kick a ball the right way. I would teach him the way to go … to pass the ball in front of the player so he could run on to it. And I would teach him how to trap it.

In his biography of Don Revie: Portrait of a Footballing Enigma author Andrew Mourant states Smith's influence on Revie: "He drummed into the young, receptive Revie four principles: when not in position, get into position; never beat a man by dribbling if you can beat him more easily with a pass; it is not the man on the ball but the one running into position to take the pass who constitutes the danger; and the aim is to have a man spare in a passing move. Soccer would then become easy."

During his final season with the club Leicester reached the 1949 FA Cup final in which Revie missed out on through illness. He was many fans' choice to replace Revie for the final, but this would mean a tactical shift and the moving of star striker Jack Lee to facilitate Smith's inclusion so never happened. He helped aid Johnny Duncan's tactical preparations instead.

Smith would end his career on the final fixture of the 1948–49 season, in which Leicester staved off relegation to the Third Division with a dramatic 1–1 draw with Cardiff City (there are still suggestions that the game may have been fixed). Smith retired from the game at the age of 37 after 20 years in the Leicester team. He stayed on as a coach at Leicester, however after Johnny Duncan resigned a few weeks later, Smith's ties with the club were cruelly severed under Duncan's replacement Norman Bullock

== International career ==
Despite being called up to the national squad on several occasions, Smith played only once for England against Ireland in Belfast in 1935. In the same year, he played in the Jubilee International against Scotland and also for the Football League against the Scottish League.

== Death ==
Smith died on 28 July 2006 at the age of 94. A minute's silence was held in his honour at Leicester's Championship game with Burnley the Tuesday after his death. At the time of his death, he was the oldest surviving former England international, and the last surviving pre-World War II international.

== See also ==
- One-club men
