= Cyril Parry (footballer) =

English footballer

Personal information
- Date of birth: 13 December 1937
- Place of birth: Derby, England
- Date of death: 29 January 2024 (aged 86)
- Place of death: Derby, England
- Position: Winger

Youth career
- Derby County

Senior career*
| Years | Team | Apps | (Gls) |
| 1955–1959 | Notts County | 12 | (2) |
- Bourne
- * Club domestic league appearances and goals

Cyril Parry (13 December 1937 – 29 January 2024) was an English professional footballer who played for Derby County, Notts County and Bourne, as a winger. His four brothers were also footballers – Jack played for Derby County, Ray for Bolton Wanderers and England, and Reg and Glynn who both played in non-league.
