= Bill Hunt (cricketer) =

Australian cricketer

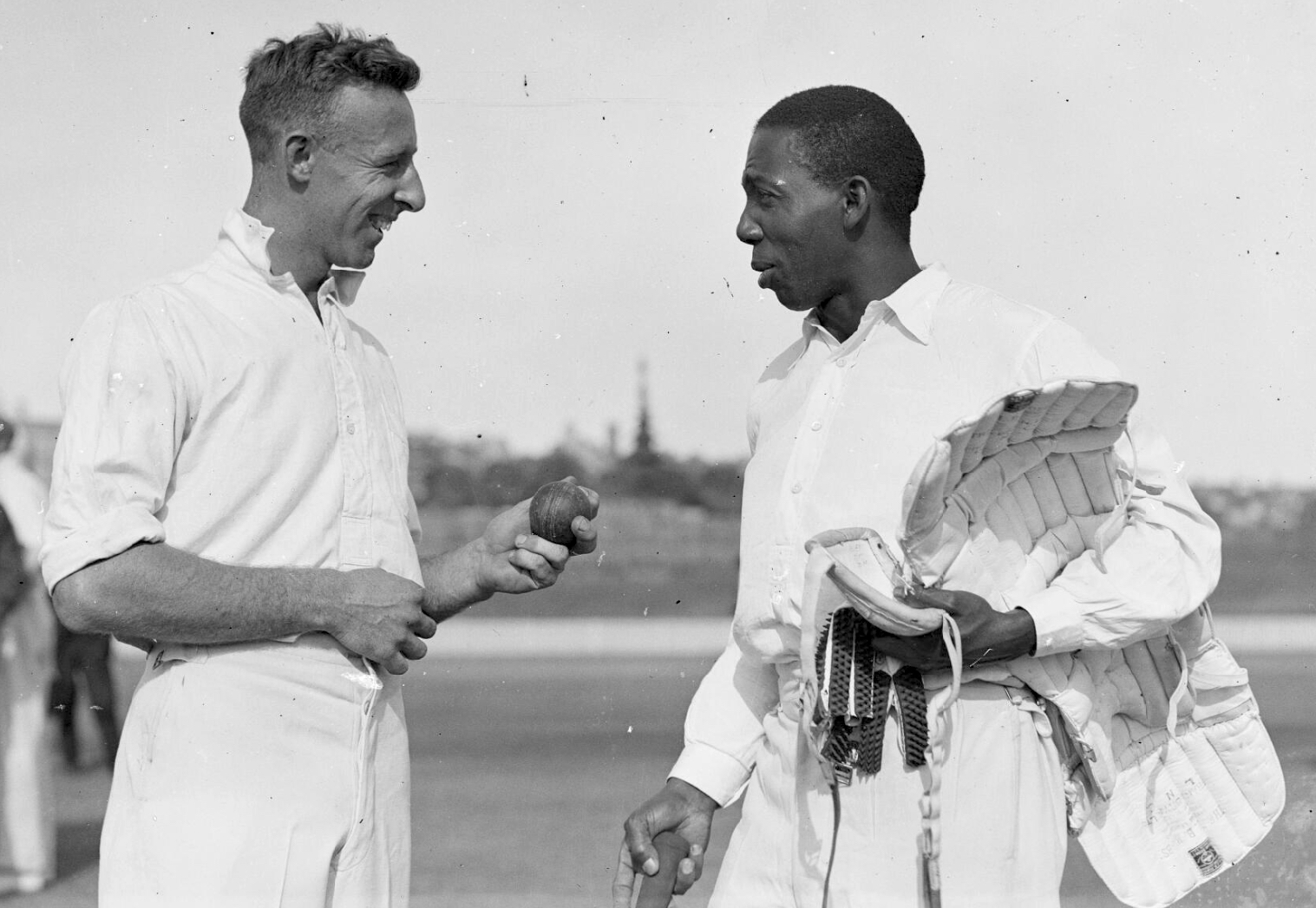
- Hunt (left) with West Indian cricketer Learie Constantine

Personal information
- Born: 26 August 1908; Balmain, Sydney, Australia
- Died: 30 December 1983 (aged 75); Balmain, Sydney, Australia
- Batting: Left-handed
- Bowling: Slow left-arm orthodox

International information
- National side: Australia
- Only Test (cap 139): 29 January 1932 v South Africa

Domestic team information
- Years: Team
- 1929–30 to 1931–32: New South Wales

Career statistics
Competition	Test	First-class
Matches	1	18
Runs scored	0	301
Batting average	0.00	14.33
100s/50s	0/0	0/0
Top score	0	45
Balls bowled	96	4,231
Wickets	0	62
Bowling average	–	23.00
5 wickets in innings	–	2
10 wickets in match	–	0
Best bowling	–	5/36
Catches/stumpings	1/–	12/–
- Source: Cricinfo, 10 September 2022

William Alfred Hunt (26 August 1908 – 30 December 1983) was an Australian cricketer who played in one Test match in 1932.

Hunt was a slow left-arm orthodox spin bowler who played first-class cricket for New South Wales from 1929–30 to 1931–32. He took 5 for 36 and 4 for 105 when New South Wales defeated South Australia by an innings and 143 runs in the 1930–31 Sheffield Shield.

In his only Test match, against South Africa in January 1932, Hunt's fellow spinners Clarrie Grimmett and Bill O'Reilly took 18 wickets between them, and Hunt did little bowling and took no wickets. He played with success for Rishton in the Lancashire League in 1934. Later he was the driving force behind the development of the museum at the Sydney Cricket Ground.
