= 1957–58 Western Football League =

Western Football League
- Season: 1957–58
- Champions: Salisbury (Division One); Poole Town Reserves (Division Two)

The 1957–58 season was the 56th in the history of the Western Football League.

The champions for the first time in their history were Salisbury, and the winners of Division Two were Poole Town Reserves.

== Division One ==
Division One remained at nineteen clubs after Wells City were relegated the previous season, Poole Town joined the Southern League, and two clubs joined:

- Cinderford Town, champions of Division Two
- Minehead, fourth in Division Two

Pos	Team	Pld	W	D	L	GF	GA	GR	Pts	Relegation
1	Salisbury	36	18	11	7	55	30	1.833	47	
2	Bridgwater Town	36	20	5	11	78	53	1.472	45	
3	Dorchester Town	36	19	6	11	87	57	1.526	44	
4	Barnstaple Town	36	17	7	12	83	48	1.729	41	
5	Trowbridge Town	36	15	11	10	80	61	1.311	41	Joined the Southern League South-East Division
6	Bristol Rovers Colts	36	16	8	12	80	74	1.081	40	
7	Torquay United Reserves	36	15	9	12	70	56	1.250	39	
8	Bristol City Colts	36	16	7	13	70	59	1.186	39	
9	Minehead	36	16	5	15	68	76	0.895	37	
10	Frome Town	36	16	5	15	66	77	0.857	37	
11	Cinderford Town	36	17	2	17	72	70	1.029	36	
12	Taunton Town	36	11	13	12	48	55	0.873	35	
13	Bideford Town	36	14	5	17	62	55	1.127	33	
14	Weymouth Reserves	36	13	7	16	89	85	1.047	33	
15	Chippenham Town	36	13	7	16	71	74	0.959	33	
16	Glastonbury	36	12	7	17	50	79	0.633	31	
17	Yeovil Town Reserves	36	13	4	19	66	92	0.717	30	
18	Portland United	36	12	3	21	58	80	0.725	27	
19	Chippenham United (R)	36	5	6	25	51	123	0.415	16	Relegated to Division Two

(R) Relegated

== Division Two ==
Division Two remained at eighteen clubs after Cinderford Town and Minehead were promoted to Division One, and two new clubs joined:

- Taunton Town Reserves
- Wells City, relegated from Division One.

Pos	Team	Pld	W	D	L	GF	GA	GR	Pts	Promotion
1	Poole Town Reserves (P)	34	26	3	5	141	48	2.938	55	Promoted to Division One
2	Gloucester City Reserves (P)	34	24	5	5	109	40	2.725	53	Promoted to Division One
3	Weston-super-Mare	34	22	9	3	102	46	2.217	53	
4	Dorchester Town Reserves	34	19	6	9	73	41	1.780	44	
5	Welton Rovers	34	18	6	10	87	64	1.359	42	
6	Trowbridge Town Reserves	34	19	3	12	88	69	1.275	41	
7	Wells City	34	16	6	12	82	68	1.206	38	
8	Street	34	13	7	14	60	73	0.822	33	
9	Bath City Reserves	34	12	8	14	76	64	1.188	32	
10	Peasedown Miners Welfare	34	13	6	15	75	98	0.765	32	
11	Ilfracombe Town	34	13	3	18	84	99	0.848	29	
12	Radstock Town	34	11	5	18	78	114	0.684	27	
13	Clandown	34	10	7	17	52	78	0.667	27	
14	Hoffman Athletic	34	9	5	20	55	85	0.647	23	
15	Taunton Town Reserves	34	9	4	21	51	89	0.573	22	
16	Paulton Rovers	34	7	7	20	59	98	0.602	21	
17	Clevedon	34	9	2	23	67	112	0.598	20	Left at the end of the season
18	Stonehouse	34	8	4	22	62	115	0.539	20	

Rules for classification: The system of using goal average to separate two teams tied on points was used up to and including the 1976–77 season. The points system: 2 points for a win, 1 point for a draw and 0 points for losing.
(P) Promoted
