= 1958–59 Western Football League =

Western Football League
- Season: 1958–59
- Champions: Yeovil Town Reserves (Division One); Bath City Reserves (Division Two)

The 1958–59 season was the 57th in the history of the Western Football League.

The champions for the first time in their history were Yeovil Town Reserves, and the winners of Division Two were Bath City Reserves.

== Division One ==
Division One remained at nineteen clubs after Chippenham United were relegated the previous season, Trowbridge Town joined the Southern League, and two clubs joined:

- Gloucester City Reserves, runners-up in Division Two
- Poole Town Reserves, champions of Division Two

Pos	Team	Pld	W	D	L	GF	GA	GR	Pts	Relegation
1	Yeovil Town Reserves	36	26	3	7	115	54	2.130	55	
2	Salisbury	36	24	3	9	91	53	1.717	51	
3	Dorchester Town	36	23	2	11	110	61	1.803	48	
4	Bridgwater Town	36	21	6	9	81	57	1.421	48	
5	Barnstaple Town	36	20	5	11	85	68	1.250	45	
6	Chippenham Town	36	20	3	13	104	66	1.576	43	
7	Bideford Town	36	15	11	10	83	60	1.383	41	
8	Torquay United Reserves	36	18	3	15	70	70	1.000	39	
9	Weymouth Reserves	36	18	2	16	84	63	1.333	38	
10	Cinderford Town	36	15	4	17	60	63	0.952	34	Left at the end of the season
11	Bristol Rovers Colts	36	14	6	16	73	77	0.948	34	
12	Glastonbury	36	15	3	18	63	81	0.778	33	
13	Taunton Town	36	15	2	19	53	68	0.779	32	
14	Bristol City Colts	36	12	7	17	75	88	0.852	31	
15	Portland United	36	13	5	18	68	82	0.829	31	
16	Poole Town Reserves	36	10	7	19	63	91	0.692	27	
17	Gloucester City Reserves	36	9	5	22	64	91	0.703	23	
18	Minehead	36	6	7	23	50	111	0.450	19	
19	Frome Town (R)	36	4	4	28	52	140	0.371	12	Relegated to Division Two

(R) Relegated

== Division Two ==
Division Two was reduced from eighteen clubs to seventeen after Gloucester City Reserves and Poole Town Reserves were promoted to Division One, Clevedon left, and two new clubs joined:

- Bridgwater Town Reserves
- Chippenham United, relegated from Division One.

Pos	Team	Pld	W	D	L	GF	GA	GR	Pts	Promotion
1	Bath City Reserves (P)	32	20	7	5	95	39	2.436	47	Promoted to Division One
2	Trowbridge Town Reserves (P)	32	20	5	7	88	56	1.571	45	Promoted to Division One
3	Street	32	18	5	9	73	56	1.304	41	
4	Bridgwater Town Reserves	32	16	8	8	81	55	1.473	40	
5	Welton Rovers	32	18	3	11	80	53	1.509	39	
6	Dorchester Town Reserves	32	16	6	10	73	52	1.404	38	
7	Weston-super-Mare	32	16	5	11	80	59	1.356	37	
8	Paulton Rovers	32	16	5	11	87	71	1.225	37	
9	Stonehouse	32	16	4	12	85	47	1.809	36	
10	Chippenham United	32	14	7	11	65	54	1.204	35	
11	Taunton Town Reserves	32	11	6	15	58	81	0.716	28	
12	Peasedown Miners Welfare	32	9	9	14	64	89	0.719	27	
13	Clandown	32	10	6	16	58	74	0.784	26	
14	Radstock Town	32	10	5	17	61	76	0.803	25	
15	Ilfracombe Town	32	7	5	20	48	108	0.444	19	Left at the end of the season
16	Hoffman Athletic	32	4	4	24	49	107	0.458	12	Left at the end of the season
17	Wells City	32	5	2	25	44	112	0.393	12	

Rules for classification: The system of using goal average to separate two teams tied on points was used up to and including the 1976–77 season. The points system: 2 points for a win, 1 point for a draw and 0 points for losing.
(P) Promoted
