= 1951–52 Western Football League =

Western Football League
- Season: 1951–52
- Champions: Chippenham Town (Division One); Bideford Town (Division Two)

The 1951–52 season was the 50th in the history of the Western Football League.

The champions for the first time in their history were Chippenham Town, and the winners of Division Two were Bideford Town.

== Division One ==
Division One remained at eighteen members with two clubs promoted to replace Yeovil Town Reserves and Peasedown Miners Welfare who were relegated to Division Two.

- Bath City Reserves, runners-up in Division Two
- Stonehouse, champions of Division Two

Pos	Team	Pld	W	D	L	GF	GA	GR	Pts	Relegation
1	Chippenham Town	34	23	4	7	103	41	2.512	50	
2	Glastonbury	34	20	6	8	87	64	1.359	46	
3	Barnstaple Town	34	18	6	10	87	62	1.403	42	
4	Weymouth Reserves	34	18	5	11	84	54	1.556	41	
5	Trowbridge Town	34	19	3	12	85	58	1.466	41	
6	Stonehouse	34	15	7	12	82	61	1.344	37	
7	Wells City	34	12	13	9	65	60	1.083	37	
8	Bath City Reserves	34	14	8	12	53	51	1.039	36	
9	Cheltenham Town Reserves	34	13	8	13	56	55	1.018	34	Left at the end of the season
10	Street	34	14	6	14	65	71	0.915	34	
11	Clandown	34	11	10	13	63	75	0.840	32	
12	Salisbury	34	10	9	15	62	68	0.912	29	
13	Dorchester Town	34	11	7	16	61	81	0.753	29	
14	Chippenham United	34	10	8	16	59	70	0.843	28	
15	Portland United	34	9	8	17	49	73	0.671	26	
16	Paulton Rovers	34	10	5	19	64	96	0.667	25	
17	Bristol Rovers Colts (R)	34	6	11	17	46	75	0.613	23	Relegated to Division Two
18	Poole Town (R)	34	8	6	20	50	106	0.472	22	Relegated to Division Two

(R) Relegated

== Division Two ==
Division Two was reduced from twenty clubs to nineteen, after Stonehouse and Bath City Reserves were promoted to Division One, and National Smelting Company and Soundwell left the league. Three new clubs joined:

- Gloucester City Reserves
- Peasedown Miners Welfare, relegated from Division One.
- Yeovil Town Reserves, relegated from Division One.

Pos	Team	Pld	W	D	L	GF	GA	GR	Pts	Promotion
1	Bideford Town (P)	36	29	3	4	179	55	3.255	61 (Note: The tables as published at the time contained errors, hence the totals do not balance in some columns.)	Promoted to Division One
2	Bridgwater Town (P)	36	28	1	7	126	38	3.316	57	Promoted to Division One
3	Ilfracombe Town	36	25	4	7	106	50	2.120	54	
4	Minehead	36	24	2	10	80	60	1.333	50	
5	Gloucester City Reserves	36	19	5	12	107	73	1.466	43	
6	Cinderford Town	36	18	6	12	95	69	1.377	42	
7	Peasedown Miners Welfare	36	17	8	11	80	72	1.111	42	
8	Bristol City Colts	36	17	7	12	87	58	1.500	41	
9	Yeovil Town Reserves	36	18	4	14	94	102	0.922	40	
10	Frome Town	36	15	7	14	89	76	1.171	37	
11	Clevedon	36	16	5	15	98	89	1.101	37	
12	Radstock Town	36	17	2	17	108	103	1.049	36	
13	Chippenham Town Reserves	36	12	5	19	63	89	0.708	29	
14	Hoffman Athletic	36	13	3	20	66	101	0.653	29	
15	Welton Rovers	36	11	2	23	73	116	0.629	24	
16	Weston-super-Mare	36	7	5	24	42	115	0.365	19	
17	Swindon Town Colts	36	7	4	25	54	120	0.450	18	Left at the end of the season
18	Trowbridge Town Reserves	36	5	4	27	56	117	0.479	14	
19	Chipping Sodbury	36	3	5	28	43	143	0.301	11	Left at the end of the season

Rules for classification: The system of using goal average to separate two teams tied on points was used up to and including the 1976–77 season. The points system: 2 points for a win, 1 point for a draw and 0 points for losing.
(P) Promoted
