= 1952–53 Western Football League =

Western Football League
- Season: 1952–53
- Champions: Barnstaple Town (Division One); Chippenham Town Reserves (Division Two)

The 1952–53 season was the 51st in the history of the Western Football League.

The champions for the first time in their history were Barnstaple Town, and the winners of Division Two were Chippenham Town Reserves, although they could not be promoted as the club's first team was already in Division One.

== Division One ==
Division One was reduced from eighteen members to seventeen after Cheltenham Town Reserves left the league, with two clubs promoted to replace Bristol Rovers Colts and Poole Town who were relegated to Division Two.

- Bideford Town, champions of Division Two
- Bridgwater Town, runners-up in Division Two

Only one club was relegated from Division One this season in order to even up the numbers in each division.

Pos	Team	Pld	W	D	L	GF	GA	GR	Pts	Relegation
1	Barnstaple Town	32	18	8	6	77	37	2.081	44	
2	Street	32	19	6	7	89	43	2.070	44	
3	Trowbridge Town	32	17	7	8	76	48	1.583	41	
4	Bideford Town	32	13	13	6	79	52	1.519	39	
5	Chippenham Town	32	17	3	12	84	58	1.448	37	
6	Weymouth Reserves	32	16	5	11	75	58	1.293	37	
7	Chippenham United	32	15	5	12	62	62	1.000	35	
8	Salisbury	32	11	10	11	60	65	0.923	32	
9	Glastonbury	32	15	1	16	61	49	1.245	31	
10	Bath City Reserves	32	10	11	11	64	63	1.016	31	
11	Stonehouse	32	11	8	13	57	58	0.983	30	
12	Portland United	32	11	8	13	66	77	0.857	30	
13	Bridgwater Town	32	12	4	16	58	73	0.795	28	
14	Wells City	32	9	6	17	52	71	0.732	24	
15	Clandown	32	7	9	16	40	74	0.541	23	
16	Dorchester Town	32	8	5	19	46	74	0.622	21	
17	Paulton Rovers (R)	32	6	5	21	42	126	0.333	17	Relegated to Division Two

(R) Relegated

== Division Two ==
Division Two was reduced from nineteen clubs to eighteen after Bideford Town and Bridgwater Town were promoted to Division One, and Chipping Sodbury and Swindon Town Colts left the league. Three new clubs joined:

- Bristol Rovers Colts, relegated from Division One.
- Poole Town, relegated from Division One.
- Stonehouse Reserves

Pos	Team	Pld	W	D	L	GF	GA	GR	Pts	Promotion
1	Chippenham Town Reserves (Note: Chippenham Town Reserves could not be promoted as the club's first team was already in Division One.)	34	24	4	6	99	51	1.941	52	
2	Ilfracombe Town (P)	34	20	11	3	67	28	2.393	51	Promoted to Division One
3	Poole Town (P)	34	21	7	6	97	42	2.310	49	Promoted to Division One
4	Peasedown Miners Welfare	34	19	3	12	76	63	1.206	41	
5	Minehead	34	15	8	11	81	53	1.528	38	
6	Clevedon	34	17	3	14	82	92	0.891	37	
7	Cinderford Town	34	15	6	13	77	50	1.540	36	
8	Bristol City Colts	34	14	6	14	75	56	1.339	34	
9	Bristol Rovers Colts	34	12	9	13	74	54	1.370	33	
10	Frome Town	34	13	6	15	66	66	1.000	32	
11	Yeovil Town Reserves	34	13	5	16	83	78	1.064	31	
12	Gloucester City Reserves	34	11	6	17	81	97	0.835	28	
13	Radstock Town	34	11	6	17	74	102	0.725	28	
14	Trowbridge Town Reserves	34	11	4	19	70	89	0.787	26	
15	Stonehouse Reserves	34	10	6	18	68	107	0.636	26	
16	Welton Rovers	34	10	6	18	53	98	0.541	26	
17	Weston-super-Mare	34	10	4	20	65	113	0.575	24	
18	Hoffman Athletic	34	8	4	22	60	109	0.550	20	

Rules for classification: The system of using goal average to separate two teams tied on points was used up to and including the 1976–77 season. The points system: 2 points for a win, 1 point for a draw and 0 points for losing.
(P) Promoted
