= 1948–49 Western Football League =

Western Football League
- Season: 1948–49
- Champions: Glastonbury (Division One); Chippenham United (Division Two)

The 1948–49 season was the 47th in the history of the Western Football League.

The champions for the first time in their history were Glastonbury, and the winners of Division Two were new club Chippenham United.

== Division One ==
Division One remained at eighteen members with two clubs promoted to replace Radstock Town and Bristol Aeroplane Company, who were relegated to Division Two.

- Salisbury, champions of Division Two
- Weymouth, runners-up in Division Two
- Bristol City and Bristol Rovers replaced their Reserve teams with their Colts.

Pos	Team	Pld	W	D	L	GF	GA	GR	Pts	Relegation
1	Glastonbury	34	24	6	4	93	50	1.860	54	
2	Trowbridge Town	34	22	6	6	109	44	2.477	50	
3	Weymouth	34	22	4	8	100	44	2.273	48	Joined the Southern League
4	Chippenham Town	34	19	5	10	94	50	1.880	43	
5	Street	34	18	4	12	90	58	1.552	40	
6	Salisbury	34	17	5	12	78	51	1.529	39	
7	Bristol Rovers Colts	34	12	12	10	65	63	1.032	36	
8	Paulton Rovers	34	13	6	15	57	64	0.891	32	
9	Wells City	34	14	4	16	51	67	0.761	32	
10	Bath City Reserves	34	14	4	16	63	92	0.685	32	
11	Poole Town	34	13	5	16	59	65	0.908	31	
12	Soundwell	34	13	5	16	76	100	0.760	31	
13	Peasedown Miners Welfare	34	12	3	19	54	81	0.667	27	
14	Clandown	34	12	3	19	55	102	0.539	27	
15	Portland United	34	11	4	19	51	70	0.729	26	
16	Yeovil Town Reserves	34	7	12	15	61	81	0.753	26	
17	Clevedon (R)	34	5	10	19	48	74	0.649	20	Relegated to Division Two
18	Bristol City Colts (R)	34	7	4	23	57	105	0.543	18	Relegated to Division Two

(R) Relegated

== Division Two ==
Division Two was increased from thirteen to eighteen clubs, after Salisbury and Weymouth were promoted to Division One, and B.A.C. Reserves, RAF Colerne and RAF Locking left the league. Five new clubs joined:

- Barnstaple Town
- Bristol Aeroplane Company, relegated from Division One.
- Chippenham United
- Radstock Town, relegated from Division One.
- Weston-super-Mare

Pos	Team	Pld	W	D	L	GF	GA	GR	Pts	Promotion
1	Chippenham United (P)	34	29	3	2	145	35	4.143	61	Promoted to Division One
2	Cheltenham Town Reserves (P)	34	26	3	5	133	48	2.771	55	Promoted to Division One
3	Welton Rovers	34	23	4	7	139	68	2.044	50	
4	Radstock Town	34	21	5	8	107	64	1.672	47	
5	Weston-super-Mare	34	21	5	8	101	63	1.603	47	
6	Hoffman Athletic	34	20	2	12	88	41	2.146	42	
7	Trowbridge Town Reserves	34	17	5	12	124	75	1.653	39	
8	Frome Town	34	16	4	14	85	73	1.164	36	
9	Cinderford Town	34	13	6	15	82	103	0.796	32	
10	Dorchester Town	34	13	5	16	78	96	0.813	31	
11	Barnstaple Town	34	13	3	18	94	88	1.068	29	
12	Douglas	34	14	1	19	77	112	0.688	29	
13	Chippenham Town Reserves	34	11	4	19	81	89	0.910	26	
14	Swindon Town Reserves	34	10	6	18	78	107	0.729	26	Left at the end of the season
15	Stonehouse	34	11	2	21	71	102	0.696	24	
16	Bristol Aeroplane Company	34	9	5	20	74	109	0.679	23	
17	RAF Melksham	34	5	0	29	50	167	0.299	10	Left at the end of the season
18	National Smelting Company	34	2	1	31	42	209	0.201	5	

Rules for classification: The system of using goal average to separate two teams tied on points was used up to and including the 1976–77 season. The points system: 2 points for a win, 1 point for a draw and 0 points for losing.
(P) Promoted
