= 1956–57 Western Football League =

Western Football League
- Season: 1956–57
- Champions: Poole Town (Division One); Cinderford Town (Division Two)

The 1956–57 season was the 55th in the history of the Western Football League.

The champions for the first time in their history were Poole Town, and the winners of Division Two were Cinderford Town.

== Division One ==
Division One was increased from seventeen to nineteen clubs after no clubs were relegated the previous season. Two clubs joined:

- Taunton Town, runners-up in Division Two
- Torquay United Reserves, champions of Division Two

Pos	Team	Pld	W	D	L	GF	GA	GR	Pts	Relegation
1	Poole Town	36	26	4	6	115	48	2.396	56	Joined the Southern League
2	Trowbridge Town	36	21	5	10	83	55	1.509	47	
3	Salisbury	36	20	5	11	98	60	1.633	45	
4	Torquay United Reserves	36	18	8	10	91	55	1.655	44	
5	Portland United	36	18	8	10	84	64	1.313	44	
6	Bridgwater Town	36	17	7	12	58	54	1.074	41	
7	Dorchester Town	36	16	7	13	83	70	1.186	39	
8	Chippenham Town	36	16	7	13	77	67	1.149	39	
9	Yeovil Town Reserves	36	18	2	16	79	73	1.082	38	
10	Glastonbury	36	16	3	17	82	102	0.804	35	
11	Bristol Rovers Colts	36	14	6	16	67	90	0.744	34	
12	Weymouth Reserves	36	16	1	19	87	94	0.926	33	
13	Barnstaple Town	36	14	4	18	76	70	1.086	32	
14	Bideford Town	36	12	8	16	70	71	0.986	32	
15	Taunton Town	36	11	9	16	59	71	0.831	31	
16	Chippenham United	36	12	6	18	80	97	0.825	30	
17	Bristol City Colts	36	13	4	19	58	74	0.784	30	
18	Frome Town	36	10	2	24	46	91	0.505	22	
19	Wells City (R)	36	4	4	28	46	133	0.346	12	Relegated to Division Two

(R) Relegated

== Division Two ==
Division Two was reduced from twenty to eighteen clubs after Taunton Town and Torquay United Reserves were promoted to Division One, Chippenham Town Reserves and Frome Town Reserves left the league, and no clubs were relegated from Division One. Two new clubs joined:

- Bath City Reserves, rejoining the league after leaving Division One in 1955.
- Dorchester Town Reserves

Pos	Team	Pld	W	D	L	GF	GA	GR	Pts	Qualification
1	Cinderford Town (P)	34	28	2	4	114	31	3.677	58	Promoted to Division One
2	Trowbridge Town Reserves	34	25	4	5	112	35	3.200	54	
3	Poole Town Reserves	34	23	6	5	87	39	2.231	52	
4	Minehead (P)	34	20	5	9	83	52	1.596	45	Promoted to Division One
5	Dorchester Town Reserves	34	18	6	10	113	69	1.638	42	
6	Gloucester City Reserves	34	17	7	10	81	50	1.620	41	
7	Welton Rovers	34	18	3	13	87	74	1.176	39	
8	Stonehouse	34	14	10	10	98	70	1.400	38	
9	Bath City Reserves	34	16	6	12	91	82	1.110	38	
10	Weston-super-Mare	34	11	7	16	68	80	0.850	29	
11	Peasedown Miners Welfare	34	10	6	18	69	99	0.697	26	
12	Hoffman Athletic	34	8	10	16	52	92	0.565	26	
13	Street	34	9	7	18	48	68	0.706	25	
14	Clevedon	34	10	4	20	64	85	0.753	24	
15	Ilfracombe Town	34	7	8	19	43	82	0.524	22	
16	Radstock Town	34	9	3	22	65	141	0.461	21	
17	Paulton Rovers	34	7	3	24	50	111	0.450	17	
18	Clandown	34	6	3	25	49	114	0.430	15	

Rules for classification: The system of using goal average to separate two teams tied on points was used up to and including the 1976–77 season. The points system: 2 points for a win, 1 point for a draw and 0 points for losing.
(P) Promoted
