= 1949–50 Western Football League =

Western Football League
- Season: 1949–50
- Champions: Wells City (Division One); Barnstaple Town (Division Two); Bideford Town (Division Three)

The 1949–50 season was the 48th in the history of the Western Football League.

This was the first and only season in the history of the Western League in which it consisted of three divisions. Division Three was created largely from reserve sides of existing members, but was abandoned at the end of the season.

The champions for the first time in their history were Wells City, and the winners of Division Two were new club Barnstaple Town. Bideford Town won Division Three, only dropping one point.

== Division One ==
Division One remained at eighteen members with two clubs promoted to replace Clevedon and Bristol City Colts, who were relegated to Division Two. Weymouth had moved up to the Southern League and were replaced in Division One by their Reserves.

- Cheltenham Town Reserves, runners-up in Division Two
- Chippenham United, champions of Division Two

Pos	Team	Pld	W	D	L	GF	GA	GR	Pts	Relegation
1	Wells City	34	22	7	5	87	43	2.023	51	
2	Poole Town	34	22	7	5	88	45	1.956	51	
3	Glastonbury	34	23	4	7	78	38	2.053	50	
4	Trowbridge Town	34	22	5	7	104	40	2.600	49	
5	Cheltenham Town Reserves	34	21	4	9	91	58	1.569	46	
6	Chippenham United	34	16	8	10	57	49	1.163	40	
7	Bristol Rovers Colts	34	15	7	12	54	50	1.080	37	
8	Chippenham Town	34	13	7	14	77	70	1.100	33	
9	Street	34	12	9	13	71	75	0.947	33	
10	Weymouth Reserves	34	13	5	16	67	49	1.367	31	
11	Salisbury	34	14	3	17	64	66	0.970	31	
12	Yeovil Town Reserves	34	13	5	16	55	102	0.539	31	
13	Paulton Rovers	34	12	3	19	60	76	0.789	27	
14	Peasedown Miners Welfare	34	8	9	17	65	82	0.793	25	
15	Portland United	34	8	6	20	44	74	0.595	22	
16	Clandown	34	8	5	21	48	80	0.600	21	
17	Soundwell (R)	34	6	6	22	61	116	0.526	18	Relegated to Division Two
18	Bath City Reserves (R)	34	5	6	23	45	103	0.437	16	Relegated to Division Two

(R) Relegated

== Division Two ==
Division Two remained at eighteen clubs, after Cheltenham Town Reserves and Chippenham United were promoted to Division One, and RAF Melksham left the league. Three new clubs joined:

- Bridgwater Town
- Bristol City Colts, relegated from Division One.
- Clevedon, relegated from Division One.
- Swindon Town replaced their Reserves with their Colts.

Pos	Team	Pld	W	D	L	GF	GA	GR	Pts	Promotion
1	Barnstaple Town (P)	34	23	7	4	102	41	2.488	53	Promoted to Division One
2	Dorchester Town (P)	34	21	8	5	96	51	1.882	50	Promoted to Division One
3	Welton Rovers	34	20	7	7	81	63	1.286	47	
4	Stonehouse	34	19	6	9	83	63	1.317	44	
5	Bridgwater Town	34	17	8	9	86	49	1.755	42	
6	Trowbridge Town Reserves	34	17	8	9	81	53	1.528	42	
7	Clevedon	34	18	6	10	92	61	1.508	42	
8	Weston-super-Mare	34	16	9	9	86	73	1.178	41	
9	Bristol City Colts	34	14	8	12	89	60	1.483	36	
10	Cinderford Town	34	13	9	12	82	80	1.025	35	
11	Chippenham Town Reserves	34	14	4	16	74	73	1.014	32	
12	Frome Town	34	12	7	15	72	74	0.973	31	
13	Radstock Town	34	10	7	17	72	98	0.735	27	
14	National Smelting Company	34	8	9	17	69	99	0.697	25	
15	Swindon Town Colts	34	9	3	22	58	89	0.652	21	
16	Hoffman Athletic	34	4	13	17	33	69	0.478	21	
17	Bristol Aeroplane Company	34	3	6	25	43	138	0.312	12	Left at the end of the season
18	Douglas	34	3	5	26	49	114	0.430	11	Left at the end of the season

(P) Promoted

== Division Three ==
Division Three consisted of eleven clubs, all of which were new to the Western League except Bristol Rovers "A", this side rejoining the league having left in 1939. Seven of the other ten clubs were reserve sides of clubs in Divisions One and Two.

Pos	Team	Pld	W	D	L	GF	GA	GR	Pts	Promotion
1	Bideford Town (P)	20	19	1	0	103	20	5.150	39 (Note: The tables as published at the time contained errors, hence the totals do not balance in some columns.)	Promoted to Division Two
2	Ilfracombe Town (P)	20	16	0	4	74	37	2.000	32	Promoted to Division Two
3	Minehead (P)	20	11	5	4	49	30	1.633	27	Promoted to Division Two
4	Clevedon Reserves	20	9	7	4	50	41	1.220	25	Left at the end of the season
5	Chippenham United Reserves	20	8	2	10	45	48	0.938	18	Left at the end of the season
6	Weston-super-Mare Reserves	20	7	3	10	44	64	0.688	17	Left at the end of the season
7	Bristol Rovers "A"	20	5	6	9	36	43	0.837	16	Left at the end of the season
8	Barnstaple Town Reserves	20	5	5	10	31	45	0.689	15	Left at the end of the season
9	Welton Rovers Reserves	20	5	2	13	36	64	0.563	12	Left at the end of the season
10	Bridgwater Town Reserves	20	5	1	14	38	62	0.613	11	Left at the end of the season
11	Stonehouse Reserves	20	2	4	14	19	69	0.275	8	Left at the end of the season

Rules for classification: The system of using goal average to separate two teams tied on points was used up to and including the 1976–77 season. The points system: 2 points for a win, 1 point for a draw and 0 points for losing.
(P) Promoted
