= 1953–54 Western Football League =

Western Football League
- Season: 1953–54
- Champions: Weymouth Reserves (Division One); Bristol Rovers Colts (Division Two)

The 1953–54 season was the 52nd in the history of the Western Football League.

The champions for the first time in their history were Weymouth Reserves, and the winners of Division Two were Bristol Rovers Colts.

== Division One ==
Division One was increased from seventeen members to eighteen after two clubs were promoted to replace Paulton Rovers who were relegated to Division Two.

- Ilfracombe Town, runners-up in Division Two
- Poole Town, third in Division Two

Pos	Team	Pld	W	D	L	GF	GA	GR	Pts	Relegation
1	Weymouth Reserves	34	21	4	9	102	53	1.925	46	
2	Poole Town	34	18	8	8	73	49	1.490	44	
3	Trowbridge Town	34	19	5	10	78	62	1.258	43	
4	Barnstaple Town	34	17	7	10	74	42	1.762	41	
5	Chippenham Town	34	18	5	11	79	49	1.612	41	
6	Salisbury	34	17	6	11	74	60	1.233	40	
7	Portland United	34	18	3	13	71	63	1.127	39	
8	Wells City	34	15	7	12	63	68	0.926	37	
9	Bridgwater Town	34	15	6	13	72	76	0.947	36	
10	Bideford Town	34	13	8	13	70	66	1.061	34	
11	Dorchester Town	34	14	5	15	79	69	1.145	33	
12	Chippenham United	34	13	6	15	60	63	0.952	32	
13	Glastonbury	34	12	8	14	59	70	0.843	32	
14	Street	34	12	8	14	55	69	0.797	32	
15	Bath City Reserves	34	10	6	18	40	66	0.606	26	
16	Ilfracombe Town	34	9	5	20	40	77	0.519	23	
17	Stonehouse (R)	34	7	6	21	51	80	0.638	20	Relegated to Division Two
18	Clandown (R)	34	4	5	25	29	87	0.333	13	Relegated to Division Two

(R) Relegated

== Division Two ==
Division Two remained at eighteen clubs after Ilfracombe Town and Poole Town were promoted to Division One. Two new clubs joined:

- Paulton Rovers, relegated from Division One.
- Poole Town Reserves, rejoining after leaving the league in 1928.

Pos	Team	Pld	W	D	L	GF	GA	GR	Pts	Promotion
1	Bristol Rovers Colts (P)	34	24	6	4	89	43	2.070	54	Promoted to Division One
2	Bristol City Colts (P)	34	22	6	6	87	39	2.231	50	Promoted to Division One
3	Frome Town	34	21	7	6	99	50	1.980	49	
4	Chippenham Town Reserves	34	18	9	7	87	58	1.500	45	
5	Welton Rovers	34	16	6	12	54	53	1.019	38	
6	Cinderford Town	34	15	7	12	82	72	1.139	37	
7	Poole Town Reserves	34	15	5	14	79	61	1.295	35	
8	Weston-super-Mare	34	14	7	13	89	70	1.271	35	
9	Trowbridge Town Reserves	34	12	9	13	90	88	1.023	33	
10	Gloucester City Reserves	34	13	7	14	85	96	0.885	33	
11	Hoffman Athletic	34	13	5	16	74	61	1.213	31	
12	Yeovil Town Reserves	34	12	7	15	90	89	1.011	31	
13	Paulton Rovers	34	12	7	15	69	84	0.821	31	
14	Minehead	34	11	6	17	62	78	0.795	28	
15	Clevedon	34	11	4	19	77	101	0.762	26	
16	Radstock Town	34	10	4	20	71	107	0.664	24	
17	Peasedown Miners Welfare	34	8	5	21	56	133	0.421	21	
18	Stonehouse Reserves	34	4	3	27	45	102	0.441	11	Left at the end of the season

Rules for classification: The system of using goal average to separate two teams tied on points was used up to and including the 1976–77 season. The points system: 2 points for a win, 1 point for a draw and 0 points for losing.
(P) Promoted
