= 1955–56 Western Football League =

Season of the Western Football League

Western Football League
- Season: 1955–56
- Champions: Trowbridge Town (Division One); Torquay United Reserves (Division Two)

The 1955–56 season was the 54th in the history of the Western Football League.

The champions for the fourth time in their history were Trowbridge Town, and the winners of Division Two were the returning Torquay United Reserves.

== Division One ==
Division One was reduced from eighteen to seventeen clubs after Ilfracombe Town and Street were relegated to Division Two, and Bath City Reserves left the league. Two clubs joined:

- Frome Town, runners-up in Division Two
- Yeovil Town Reserves, champions of Division Two

Pos	Team	Pld	W	D	L	GF	GA	GR	Pts
1	Trowbridge Town	32	24	2	6	100	36	2.778	50
2	Poole Town	32	20	7	5	79	33	2.394	47
3	Dorchester Town	32	21	4	7	106	57	1.860	46
4	Chippenham Town	32	20	4	8	70	50	1.400	44
5	Salisbury	32	17	7	8	64	31	2.065	41
6	Bideford Town	32	14	10	8	58	50	1.160	38
7	Portland United	32	16	3	13	87	76	1.145	35
8	Barnstaple Town	32	15	4	13	61	66	0.924	34
9	Weymouth Reserves	32	10	12	10	63	70	0.900	32
10	Frome Town	32	10	7	15	69	64	1.078	27
11	Yeovil Town Reserves	32	11	5	16	57	86	0.663	27
12	Bristol Rovers Colts	32	10	4	18	49	65	0.754	24
13	Bristol City Colts	32	8	7	17	43	63	0.683	23
14	Wells City	32	8	7	17	53	92	0.576	23
15	Bridgwater Town	32	7	5	20	59	98	0.602	19
16	Chippenham United	32	7	5	20	54	90	0.600	19
17	Glastonbury	32	3	9	20	47	92	0.511	15

- No clubs were relegated from Division One this season.

== Division Two ==
Division Two was increased from eighteen to twenty clubs after Frome Town and Yeovil Town Reserves were promoted to Division One, and four new clubs joined:

- Frome Town Reserves
- Ilfracombe Town, relegated from Division One.
- Street, relegated from Division One.
- Torquay United Reserves, rejoining after leaving the league in 1939.

Pos	Team	Pld	W	D	L	GF	GA	GR	Pts	Promotion
1	Torquay United Reserves (P)	38	27	6	5	135	38	3.553	60	Promoted to Division One
2	Taunton Town (P)	38	26	3	9	115	46	2.500	55	Promoted to Division One
3	Gloucester City Reserves	38	24	5	9	104	56	1.857	53	
4	Weston-super-Mare	38	21	9	8	126	59	2.136	51	
5	Stonehouse	38	21	7	10	92	55	1.673	49	
6	Trowbridge Town Reserves	38	20	7	11	98	74	1.324	47	
7	Minehead	38	20	6	12	104	69	1.507	46	
8	Clevedon	38	19	8	11	99	71	1.394	46	
9	Frome Town Reserves	38	20	6	12	101	76	1.329	46	Left at the end of the season
10	Ilfracombe Town	38	18	5	15	82	70	1.171	41	
11	Poole Town Reserves	38	14	8	16	86	71	1.211	36	
12	Chippenham Town Reserves	38	13	7	18	80	97	0.825	33	Left at the end of the season
13	Clandown	38	13	6	19	87	105	0.829	32	
14	Cinderford Town	38	13	5	20	85	82	1.037	31	
15	Welton Rovers	38	12	6	20	73	95	0.768	30	
16	Street	38	11	4	23	70	112	0.625	26	
17	Peasedown Miners Welfare	38	8	9	21	57	141	0.404	25	
18	Hoffman Athletic	38	7	6	25	46	109	0.422	20	
19	Radstock Town	38	7	3	28	52	165	0.315	17	
20	Paulton Rovers	38	6	4	28	56	157	0.357	16	

Rules for classification: The system of using goal average to separate two teams tied on points was used up to and including the 1976–77 season. The points system: 2 points for a win, 1 point for a draw and 0 points for losing.
(P) Promoted
