= 1954–55 Western Football League =

Western Football League
- Season: 1954–55
- Champions: Dorchester Town (Division One); Yeovil Town Reserves (Division Two)

The 1954–55 season was the 53rd in the history of the Western Football League.

The champions for the first time in their history were Dorchester Town, and the winners of Division Two were Yeovil Town Reserves.

== Division One ==
Division One remained at eighteen clubs after two clubs were promoted to replace Clandown and Stonehouse who were relegated to Division Two.

- Bristol City Colts, runners-up in Division Two
- Bristol Rovers Colts, champions of Division Two

Pos	Team	Pld	W	D	L	GF	GA	GR	Pts	Relegation
1	Dorchester Town	34	23	5	6	103	46	2.239	51	
2	Chippenham Town	34	21	7	6	83	39	2.128	49	
3	Bath City Reserves	34	22	4	8	87	52	1.673	48	Left at the end of the season
4	Salisbury	34	17	8	9	71	50	1.420	42	
5	Portland United	34	18	6	10	89	70	1.271	42	
6	Bideford Town	34	18	6	10	69	56	1.232	42	
7	Bridgwater Town	34	18	5	11	91	69	1.319	41	
8	Poole Town	34	13	12	9	80	62	1.290	38	
9	Bristol Rovers Colts	34	16	5	13	73	55	1.327	37	
10	Barnstaple Town	34	13	8	13	69	66	1.045	34	
11	Trowbridge Town	34	14	5	15	65	55	1.182	33	
12	Bristol City Colts	34	11	4	19	53	62	0.855	26	
13	Weymouth Reserves	34	10	6	18	49	67	0.731	26	
14	Chippenham United	34	10	5	19	57	97	0.588	25	
15	Glastonbury	34	8	9	17	51	89	0.573	25	
16	Wells City	34	5	9	20	49	90	0.544	19	
17	Street (R)	34	7	4	23	51	100	0.510	18	Relegated to Division Two
18	Ilfracombe Town (R)	34	5	6	23	35	100	0.350	16	Relegated to Division Two

(R) Relegated

== Division Two ==
Division Two remained at eighteen clubs after Stonehouse Reserves left the league, and Bristol City Colts and Bristol Rovers Colts were promoted to Division One. Three new clubs joined:

- Clandown, relegated from Division One.
- Stonehouse, relegated from Division One.
- Taunton Town

Pos	Team	Pld	W	D	L	GF	GA	GR	Pts	Qualification
1	Yeovil Town Reserves (P)	34	23	5	6	115	49	2.347	51	Promoted to Division One
2	Frome Town (P)	34	24	3	7	106	49	2.163	51	Promoted to Division One
3	Weston-super-Mare	34	22	4	8	122	58	2.103	48	
4	Chippenham Town Reserves	34	18	8	8	102	60	1.700	44	
5	Taunton Town	34	20	3	11	95	57	1.667	43	
6	Gloucester City Reserves	34	16	8	10	80	61	1.311	40	
7	Minehead	34	15	6	13	104	65	1.600	36	
8	Cinderford Town	34	12	12	10	85	79	1.076	36	
9	Stonehouse	34	15	5	14	87	83	1.048	35	
10	Poole Town Reserves	34	15	4	15	82	71	1.155	34	
11	Welton Rovers	34	13	6	15	70	77	0.909	32	
12	Peasedown Miners Welfare	34	12	6	16	79	102	0.775	30	
13	Clandown	34	12	6	16	45	75	0.600	30	
14	Clevedon	34	12	4	18	82	90	0.911	28	
15	Hoffman Athletic	34	11	3	20	53	97	0.546	25	
16	Trowbridge Town Reserves	34	10	3	21	43	86	0.500	23	
17	Radstock Town	34	5	6	23	54	135	0.400	16	
18	Paulton Rovers	34	5	0	29	47	157	0.299	10	

Rules for classification: The system of using goal average to separate two teams tied on points was used up to and including the 1976–77 season. The points system: 2 points for a win, 1 point for a draw and 0 points for losing.
(P) Promoted
