= 1947–48 Western Football League =

Western Football League
- Season: 1947–48
- Champions: Trowbridge Town (Division One); Salisbury (Division Two)

The 1947–48 season was the 46th in the history of the Western Football League.

The champions for the third time in their history and for the second consecutive season were Trowbridge Town, and the winners of Division Two were new club Salisbury, formed after the previous Salisbury club disbanded.

Two games in each division were left unplayed at the end of the season, and were ignored.

== Division One ==
Division One remained at eighteen members with two clubs promoted to replace Frome Town and Welton Rovers, who were relegated to Division Two.

- Clandown, champions of Division Two
- Soundwell, runners-up in Division Two

| Pos | Team | Pld | W | D | L | GF | GA | GR | Pts | Relegation |
|---|---|---|---|---|---|---|---|---|---|---|
| 1 | Trowbridge Town | 34 | 29 | 3 | 2 | 131 | 33 | 3.970 | 61 | |
| 2 | Glastonbury | 34 | 26 | 3 | 5 | 119 | 40 | 2.975 | 55 | |
| 3 | Street | 34 | 23 | 7 | 4 | 98 | 40 | 2.450 | 53 | |
| 4 | Bristol Rovers Reserves | 34 | 21 | 6 | 7 | 121 | 60 | 2.017 | 48 | Left at the end of the season |
| 5 | Clevedon | 34 | 20 | 4 | 10 | 117 | 66 | 1.773 | 44 | |
| 6 | Clandown | 34 | 16 | 5 | 13 | 84 | 80 | 1.050 | 37 | |
| 7 | Poole Town | 33 | 14 | 6 | 13 | 73 | 72 | 1.014 | 34 | |
| 8 | Yeovil Town Reserves | 34 | 14 | 4 | 16 | 70 | 79 | 0.886 | 32 | |
| 9 | Paulton Rovers | 34 | 13 | 5 | 16 | 78 | 93 | 0.839 | 31 | |
| 10 | Portland United | 34 | 11 | 7 | 16 | 64 | 72 | 0.889 | 29 | |
| 11 | Bristol City Reserves | 34 | 11 | 7 | 16 | 69 | 104 | 0.663 | 29 | Left at the end of the season |
| 12 | Bath City Reserves | 34 | 10 | 8 | 16 | 56 | 82 | 0.683 | 28 | |
| 13 | Wells City | 34 | 11 | 5 | 18 | 58 | 71 | 0.817 | 27 | |
| 14 | Peasedown Miners Welfare | 34 | 11 | 5 | 18 | 74 | 96 | 0.771 | 27 | |
| 15 | Soundwell | 32 | 8 | 7 | 17 | 64 | 103 | 0.621 | 23 | |
| 16 | Chippenham Town | 33 | 8 | 6 | 19 | 65 | 97 | 0.670 | 22 | |
| 17 | Radstock Town (R) | 34 | 8 | 3 | 23 | 64 | 108 | 0.593 | 19 | Relegated to Division Two |
| 18 | Bristol Aeroplane Company (R) | 34 | 4 | 1 | 29 | 56 | 165 | 0.339 | 9 | Relegated to Division Two |

(R) Relegated

== Division Two ==
Division Two was increased from thirteen to eighteen clubs, after Clandown and Soundwell were promoted to Division One, and Thorney Pitts disbanded. Eight new clubs joined:

- Cheltenham Town Reserves
- Dorchester Town
- Frome Town, relegated from Division One.
- National Smelting Company
- Salisbury
- Stonehouse
- Welton Rovers, relegated from Division One.
- Weymouth, rejoining after leaving the league in 1939.

| Pos | Team | Pld | W | D | L | GF | GA | GR | Pts | Promotion |
|---|---|---|---|---|---|---|---|---|---|---|
| 1 | Salisbury (P) | 34 | 29 | 1 | 4 | 145 | 33 | 4.394 | 59 | Promoted to Division One |
| 2 | Weymouth (P) | 34 | 26 | 4 | 4 | 148 | 37 | 4.000 | 56 | Promoted to Division One |
| 3 | Cheltenham Town Reserves | 34 | 25 | 3 | 6 | 142 | 42 | 3.381 | 53 | |
| 4 | Welton Rovers | 34 | 21 | 3 | 10 | 85 | 49 | 1.735 | 45 | |
| 5 | Frome Town | 33 | 22 | 0 | 11 | 114 | 76 | 1.500 | 44 | |
| 6 | Hoffman Athletic | 34 | 19 | 5 | 10 | 79 | 50 | 1.580 | 43 | |
| 7 | Trowbridge Town Reserves | 33 | 17 | 5 | 11 | 92 | 59 | 1.559 | 39 | |
| 8 | Swindon Town Reserves | 34 | 17 | 4 | 13 | 95 | 76 | 1.250 | 38 | |
| 9 | Douglas | 34 | 18 | 2 | 14 | 104 | 88 | 1.182 | 38 | |
| 10 | Dorchester Town | 34 | 13 | 6 | 15 | 64 | 79 | 0.810 | 32 | |
| 11 | Cinderford Town | 34 | 12 | 7 | 15 | 87 | 103 | 0.845 | 31 | |
| 12 | National Smelting Company | 34 | 13 | 5 | 16 | 80 | 102 | 0.784 | 31 | |
| 13 | Stonehouse | 34 | 7 | 7 | 20 | 64 | 113 | 0.566 | 21 | |
| 14 | Chippenham Town Reserves | 34 | 8 | 4 | 22 | 63 | 117 | 0.538 | 20 | |
| 15 | RAF Locking | 33 | 9 | 1 | 23 | 52 | 126 | 0.413 | 19 | Left at the end of the season |
| 16 | RAF Melksham | 34 | 7 | 4 | 23 | 63 | 136 | 0.463 | 18 | |
| 17 | RAF Colerne | 33 | 6 | 4 | 23 | 64 | 146 | 0.438 | 16 | Left at the end of the season |
| 18 | B.A.C. Reserves | 34 | 2 | 1 | 31 | 48 | 157 | 0.306 | 5 | Left at the end of the season |

Rules for classification: The system of using goal average to separate two teams tied on points was used up to and including the 1976–77 season. The points system: 2 points for a win, 1 point for a draw and 0 points for losing.
(P) Promoted
