= 1950–51 Western Football League =

Western Football League
- Season: 1950–51
- Champions: Glastonbury (Division One); Stonehouse (Division Two)

The 1950–51 season was the 49th in the history of the Western Football League.

Division Three was scrapped after only one season, and the league reverted to the previous two-division format. The champions for the second time in their history were Glastonbury, and the winners of Division Two were Stonehouse.

== Division One ==
Division One remained at eighteen members with two clubs promoted to replace Soundwell and Bath City Reserves, who were relegated to Division Two.

- Barnstaple Town, champions of Division Two
- Dorchester Town, runners-up in Division Two

Pos	Team	Pld	W	D	L	GF	GA	GR	Pts	Relegation
1	Glastonbury	34	26	6	2	102	27	3.778	58	
2	Wells City	34	22	9	3	83	39	2.128	53	
3	Chippenham Town	34	18	8	8	86	48	1.792	44	
4	Chippenham United	34	18	6	10	72	44	1.636	42	
5	Trowbridge Town	34	17	7	10	83	49	1.694	41	
6	Barnstaple Town	34	18	4	12	71	62	1.145	40	
7	Poole Town	34	18	3	13	71	71	1.000	39	
8	Salisbury	34	14	7	13	65	55	1.182	35	
9	Dorchester Town	34	13	8	13	64	58	1.103	34	
10	Street	34	13	8	13	74	69	1.072	34	
11	Weymouth Reserves	34	13	6	15	54	56	0.964	32	
12	Cheltenham Town Reserves	34	12	7	15	56	61	0.918	31	
13	Bristol Rovers Colts	34	11	8	15	60	85	0.706	30	
14	Clandown	34	10	9	15	49	58	0.845	29	
15	Paulton Rovers	34	9	9	16	62	75	0.827	27	
16	Portland United	34	6	7	21	56	112	0.500	19	
17	Yeovil Town Reserves (R)	34	8	3	23	38	79	0.481	19	Relegated to Division Two
18	Peasedown Miners Welfare (R)	34	1	3	30	25	123	0.203	5	Relegated to Division Two

(R) Relegated

== Division Two ==
Division Two was increased from eighteen clubs to twenty, after Barnstaple Town and Dorchester Town were promoted to Division One, and Bristol Aeroplane Company and Douglas left the league. Six new clubs joined:

- Bath City Reserves, relegated from Division One.
- Bideford Town, promoted as champions of Division Three.
- Chipping Sodbury
- Ilfracombe Town, promoted as runners-up of Division Three.
- Minehead, promoted as third-placed club in Division Three.
- Soundwell, relegated from Division One.

Pos	Team	Pld	W	D	L	GF	GA	GR	Pts	Promotion
1	Stonehouse (P)	38	29	7	2	133	36	3.694	65	Promoted to Division One
2	Bath City Reserves (P)	38	28	5	5	114	44	2.591	61	Promoted to Division One
3	Bideford Town	38	27	6	5	158	54	2.926	60	
4	Cinderford Town	38	21	12	5	112	51	2.196	54	
5	Bridgwater Town	38	24	5	9	124	50	2.480	53	
6	Ilfracombe Town	38	23	5	10	105	68	1.544	51	
7	Clevedon	38	18	6	14	95	81	1.173	42	
8	Welton Rovers	38	18	5	15	103	95	1.084	41	
9	Hoffman Athletic	38	16	8	14	74	66	1.121	40	
10	Minehead	38	16	8	14	73	74	0.986	40	
11	Frome Town	38	12	10	16	81	102	0.794	34	
12	Bristol City Colts	38	14	5	19	75	84	0.893	33	
13	Radstock Town	38	11	9	18	85	112	0.759	31	
14	Chippenham Town Reserves	38	12	6	20	83	115	0.722	30	
15	Swindon Town Colts	38	10	9	19	88	95	0.926	29	
16	Trowbridge Town Reserves	38	11	6	21	69	100	0.690	28	
17	Chipping Sodbury	38	10	3	25	75	113	0.664	23	
18	Weston-super-Mare	38	8	7	23	46	100	0.460	23	
19	Soundwell	38	6	2	30	46	165	0.279	14	Left at the end of the season
20	National Smelting Company	38	3	2	33	50	184	0.272	8	Left at the end of the season

Rules for classification: The system of using goal average to separate two teams tied on points was used up to and including the 1976–77 season. The points system: 2 points for a win, 1 point for a draw and 0 points for losing.
(P) Promoted
