= 1959–60 Western Football League =

Western Football League
- Season: 1959–60
- Champions: Torquay United Reserves (Division One); Welton Rovers (Division Two)

The 1959–60 season was the 58th in the history of the Western Football League.

The champions for the first time in their history were Torquay United Reserves, and the winners of Division Two were Welton Rovers. This season was the last to feature two divisions until 1976–77; many clubs left the league at the end of the season and the league was reduced to one division for 1960–61.

== Division One ==
Division One remained at nineteen clubs after Frome Town were relegated the previous season, Cinderford Town left, and two clubs joined:

- Bath City Reserves, champions of Division Two
- Trowbridge Town Reserves, runners-up in Division Two

Pos	Team	Pld	W	D	L	GF	GA	GR	Pts	Qualification
1	Torquay United Reserves	36	29	5	2	132	40	3.300	63	
2	Salisbury	36	20	7	9	85	43	1.977	47	
3	Chippenham Town	36	18	6	12	70	56	1.250	42	
4	Bridgwater Town	36	18	5	13	79	62	1.274	41	
5	Weymouth Reserves	36	18	4	14	72	58	1.241	40	
6	Portland United	36	17	6	13	61	68	0.897	40	
7	Bideford Town	36	15	8	13	61	62	0.984	38	
8	Bath City Reserves	36	15	7	14	63	61	1.033	37	
9	Yeovil Town Reserves	36	17	3	16	74	77	0.961	37	
10	Poole Town Reserves	36	15	6	15	73	66	1.106	36	
11	Dorchester Town	36	17	2	17	87	88	0.989	36	
12	Minehead	36	12	11	13	68	72	0.944	35	
13	Bristol Rovers Colts	36	13	8	15	79	80	0.988	34	
14	Glastonbury	36	11	10	15	66	78	0.846	32	
15	Barnstaple Town	36	13	5	18	50	65	0.769	31	
16	Taunton Town	36	11	7	18	67	96	0.698	29	
17	Bristol City Colts	36	12	4	20	65	82	0.793	28	
18	Gloucester City Reserves	36	9	4	23	49	92	0.533	22	Left at the end of the season
19	Trowbridge Town Reserves	36	5	6	25	36	91	0.396	16	

== Division Two ==
Division Two was reduced from seventeen clubs to fourteen after Bath City Reserves and Trowbridge Town Reserves were promoted to Division One, Hoffman Athletic and Ilfracombe Town left, and one new club joined:

- Frome Town, relegated from Division One.

Pos	Team	Pld	W	D	L	GF	GA	GR	Pts	Promotion
1	Welton Rovers (P)	26	20	2	4	95	40	2.375	42	Promoted to Division One
2	Stonehouse	26	17	4	5	78	43	1.814	38	Left at the end of the season
3	Weston-super-Mare (P)	26	15	6	5	100	42	2.381	36	Promoted to Division One
4	Frome Town	26	14	5	7	63	38	1.658	33	Left at the end of the season
5	Chippenham United	26	14	2	10	64	52	1.231	30	Left at the end of the season
6	Clandown	26	9	9	8	48	43	1.116	27	Left at the end of the season
7	Paulton Rovers	26	11	5	10	58	64	0.906	27	Left at the end of the season
8	Radstock Town	26	12	3	11	48	62	0.774	27	Left at the end of the season
9	Street	26	10	5	11	48	53	0.906	25	Left at the end of the season
10	Wells City	26	8	5	13	45	73	0.616	21	Left at the end of the season
11	Bridgwater Town Reserves	26	8	4	14	58	64	0.906	20	Left at the end of the season
12	Taunton Town Reserves	26	5	7	14	43	59	0.729	17	Left at the end of the season
13	Dorchester Town Reserves	26	5	5	16	43	82	0.524	15	Left at the end of the season
14	Peasedown Miners Welfare	26	1	4	21	38	114	0.333	6	Left at the end of the season

Rules for classification: The system of using goal average to separate two teams tied on points was used up to and including the 1976–77 season. The points system: 2 points for a win, 1 point for a draw and 0 points for losing.
(P) Promoted
