= 1946–47 Western Football League =

Western Football League
- Season: 1946–47
- Champions: Trowbridge Town (Division One); Clandown (Division Two)

The 1946–47 season was the 45th in the history of the Western Football League.

The league was again split into two divisions for the first time since the 1938–39 season, with seventeen new clubs having joined. The champions for the second time in their history were Trowbridge Town, and the winners of Division Two were Clandown. A system of automatic promotion and relegation was introduced for the first time, and due to the severe winter, several fixtures were not fulfilled and the season was abandoned on 5 June 1947.

== Division One ==
Division One consisted of eighteen clubs: eleven from the previous season's single division were joined by seven new clubs. All had been members of the league before the war and had left in 1939, except for Bath City Reserves and Wells City, who had left in 1940.

- Bath City Reserves
- Frome Town
- Glastonbury
- Poole Town
- Portland United
- Street
- Wells City

Pos	Team	Pld	W	D	L	GF	GA	GR	Pts	Relegation
1	Trowbridge Town	31	27	1	3	123	43	2.860	55	
2	Poole Town	29	20	5	4	86	26	3.308	45	
3	Bristol Rovers Reserves	31	19	4	8	96	53	1.811	42	
4	Chippenham Town	31	20	2	9	115	68	1.691	42	
5	Yeovil Town Reserves	30	16	4	10	85	56	1.518	36	
6	Clevedon	30	15	5	10	87	62	1.403	35	
7	Portland United	31	14	4	13	92	69	1.333	32	
8	Street	32	13	5	14	75	80	0.938	31	
9	Paulton Rovers	31	13	3	15	79	110	0.718	29	
10	Glastonbury	29	12	3	14	56	68	0.824	27	
11	Bristol Aeroplane Company	29	12	3	14	72	87	0.828	27	
12	Wells City	31	8	9	14	52	78	0.667	25	
13	Radstock Town	29	9	3	17	66	82	0.805	21	
14	Peasedown Miners Welfare	21	7	6	8	43	49	0.878	20	
15	Bristol City Reserves	24	7	1	16	50	92	0.543	15	
16	Bath City Reserves	26	5	4	17	34	72	0.472	14	
17	Frome Town (R)	29	4	3	22	45	129	0.349	11	Relegated to Division Two
18	Welton Rovers (R)	20	2	3	15	40	72	0.556	7	Relegated to Division Two

(R) Relegated

== Division Two ==
Division Two consisted of thirteen clubs: three from the previous season's single division (Clandown, Douglas and Soundwell) were joined by ten new clubs:

- B.A.C. Reserves
- Chippenham Town Reserves
- Cinderford Town
- Hoffman Athletic
- RAF Colerne
- RAF Locking
- RAF Melksham
- Swindon Town Reserves, rejoining after leaving the league in 1937.
- Thorney Pitts
- Trowbridge Town Reserves, rejoining after leaving the league in 1894.

Pos	Team	Pld	W	D	L	GF	GA	GR	Pts	Promotion
1	Clandown (P)	23	20	2	1	130	33	3.939	42 (Note: The tables as published at the time contained errors, hence the totals do not balance in some columns.)	Promoted to Division One
2	Soundwell (P)	24	17	3	4	111	44	2.523	37	Promoted to Division One
3	Douglas	23	14	2	7	107	77	1.390	30	
4	Trowbridge Town Reserves	22	13	3	6	82	50	1.640	29	
5	Swindon Town Reserves	24	11	3	10	91	77	1.182	25	
6	Hoffman Athletic	20	11	2	7	62	37	1.676	24	
7	RAF Locking	21	11	1	9	83	69	1.203	23	
8	RAF Melksham	23	7	4	12	56	83	0.675	18	
9	Cinderford Town	21	7	3	11	58	60	0.967	17	
10	B.A.C. Reserves	23	6	3	14	50	76	0.658	15	
11	Chippenham Town Reserves	20	4	3	13	47	86	0.547	11	
12	RAF Colerne	20	2	5	13	48	99	0.485	9	
13	Thorney Pitts	18	1	0	17	24	158	0.152	2	Disbanded at the end of the season

Rules for classification: The system of using goal average to separate two teams tied on points was used up to and including the 1976–77 season. The points system: 2 points for a win, 1 point for a draw and 0 points for losing.
(P) Promoted
