= 1945–46 Western Football League =

Western Football League
- Season: 1945–46
- Champions: Bristol Rovers Reserves

The 1945–46 season was the 44th in the history of the Western Football League.

This was the first season of the Western League since it was suspended at the end of the 1939–40 season due to World War II. The champions for the fifth time in their history were Bristol Rovers Reserves. For the following season, more clubs joined and the league was once again divided into two divisions.

== Final Table ==
The league consisted of fourteen clubs: eight clubs continued from the 1939–40 season and they were joined by six new clubs:

- Bristol Rovers Reserves, rejoining after leaving the league in 1939.
- Clandown, rejoining after leaving the league in 1922.
- Clevedon, rejoining after leaving the league in 1914.
- Douglas, rejoining after leaving the league in 1921.
- Soundwell
- Yeovil Town Reserves, rejoing after leaving the league in 1939 as Yeovil and Petters United Reserves.

Pos	Team	Pld	W	D	L	GF	GA	GR	Pts	Qualification
1	Bristol Rovers Reserves	26	17	6	3	120	46	2.609	40	
2	Chippenham Town	26	15	4	7	84	41	2.049	34	
3	Trowbridge Town	26	16	2	8	114	62	1.839	34	
4	Peasedown Miners Welfare	26	13	8	5	75	44	1.705	34	
5	Yeovil Town Reserves	26	12	5	9	66	58	1.138	29	
6	Douglas	26	12	3	11	82	84	0.976	27	Relegated to Division Two
7	Bristol City Reserves	26	10	6	10	90	68	1.324	26	
8	Clevedon	26	11	2	13	80	102	0.784	24	
9	Bristol Aeroplane Company	26	10	4	12	62	81	0.765	24	
10	Paulton Rovers	26	10	3	13	67	93	0.720	23	
11	Clandown	26	10	2	14	58	66	0.879	22	Relegated to Division Two
12	Radstock Town	26	9	2	15	65	82	0.793	20	
13	Soundwell	26	6	3	17	67	132	0.508	15	Relegated to Division Two
14	Welton Rovers	26	4	4	18	44	115	0.383	12	

Rules for classification: The system of using goal average to separate two teams tied on points was used up to and including the 1976–77 season. The points system: 2 points for a win, 1 point for a draw and 0 points for losing.
