= Bert Blake =

English footballer

Personal information
- Full name: Herbert Charles Edwin Blake
- Date of birth: 16 March 1908
- Place of birth: Bristol, England
- Date of death: 24 April 1986 (aged 78)
- Place of death: Bath, England
- Height: 5 ft 10 1/2 in (1.79 m)
- Position: Centre half

Senior career*
Years	Team	Apps	(Gls)
–1930	Brislington Old Boys		
1930–	Bristol City	0	(0)
–1931	Glenmore		
1931	Yeovil & Petters United		
1931–1935	Bristol Rovers	31	(2)
1935–1938	Bath City		
1938–1947	Trowbridge Town		

Managerial career
- 1934–1935: Bristol Rovers (youth)
- * Club domestic league appearances and goals

Herbert Charles Edwin Blake (16 March 1908 – 24 April 1986) was an English professional footballer who played as a centre half in the Football League for Bristol Rovers.

== Personal life ==
Blake's uncle Herbert Blake was also a professional footballer. During his time with Bristol Rovers, Blake worked as a schoolmaster at Eastville Boys' School. Blake served in the Royal Artillery during the Second World War.

== Career statistics ==
Appearances and goals by club, season and competition
Club	Season	League			National cup (Note: Includes FA Cup)		Total	
Club	Season	Division	Apps	Goals	Apps	Goals	Apps	Goals
Bristol Rovers	1931–32	Third Division South	4	0	―		4	0
Bristol Rovers	1932–33	Third Division South	27	2	5	0	32	2
Career total			31	2	0	0	35	2

== Honours ==
Trowbridge Town

- Western League: 1939–40, 1946–47, 1947–48
