= 1919–20 Western Football League =

Western Football League
- Season: 1919–20
- Champions: Douglas (Division One); Frome Town (Division Two)

The 1919–20 season was the 23rd in the history of the Western Football League in South West England.

This was the first season after the end of World War I, which had halted all organised football in the United Kingdom for several years. A number of new clubs joined the league and a second division was formed. Several clubs had not rejoined the league after the war. The Division One champions this season were Douglas, in their first season in the league. Champions of Division Two were Frome Town, although it was Yeovil and Petters United that were promoted to Division One.

== Clubs ==
Eleven new clubs joined the league, and they were split into two divisions along with those clubs which had returned to the league after the war.

== Division One ==
Division One consisted of ten clubs: Bath City, Bristol Rovers Reserves and Welton Rovers, plus seven new clubs:

- Barry Reserves
- Bristol City Reserves, rejoining the league after leaving in 1911
- Douglas
- Horfield United
- Newport County Reserves
- Swansea Town Reserves
- Swindon Town Reserves, rejoining the league after leaving in 1905

| Pos | Team | Pld | W | D | L | GF | GA | GR | Pts | Result |
|---|---|---|---|---|---|---|---|---|---|---|
| 1 | Douglas | 18 | 12 | 4 | 2 | 58 | 18 | 3.222 | 28 | |
| 2 | Swansea Town Reserves | 18 | 13 | 2 | 3 | 39 | 15 | 2.600 | 28 | |
| 3 | Bristol City Reserves | 18 | 12 | 1 | 5 | 41 | 17 | 2.412 | 25 | |
| 4 | Swindon Town Reserves | 18 | 11 | 3 | 4 | 30 | 21 | 1.429 | 25 | |
| 5 | Bath City | 18 | 8 | 2 | 8 | 48 | 29 | 1.655 | 18 | |
| 6 | Welton Rovers | 18 | 6 | 1 | 11 | 29 | 47 | 0.617 | 13 | |
| 7 | Barry Reserves | 18 | 6 | 0 | 12 | 27 | 37 | 0.730 | 12 | |
| 8 | Bristol Rovers Reserves | 18 | 4 | 4 | 10 | 28 | 51 | 0.549 | 12 | |
| 9 | Newport County Reserves | 18 | 5 | 1 | 12 | 25 | 57 | 0.439 | 11 | Left at the end of the season |
| 10 | Horfield United | 18 | 1 | 4 | 13 | 21 | 54 | 0.389 | 6 | Left at the end of the season |

== Division Two ==
Division Two consisted of eight clubs: Paulton Rovers, Peasedown St John, Street and Trowbridge Town, plus four new clubs:

- Frome Town
- Glastonbury
- Timsbury Athletic
- Yeovil and Petters United

| Pos | Team | Pld | W | D | L | GF | GA | GR | Pts | Promotion |
|---|---|---|---|---|---|---|---|---|---|---|
| 1 | Frome Town | 14 | 10 | 2 | 2 | 33 | 20 | 1.650 | 22 | |
| 2 | Trowbridge Town | 14 | 8 | 2 | 4 | 36 | 18 | 2.000 | 18 | |
| 3 | Peasedown St John | 14 | 8 | 2 | 4 | 22 | 14 | 1.571 | 18 | |
| 4 | Paulton Rovers | 14 | 6 | 4 | 4 | 26 | 21 | 1.238 | 16 | |
| 5 | Yeovil and Petters United (P) | 14 | 7 | 2 | 5 | 41 | 34 | 1.206 | 16 | Promotion to Division One |
| 6 | Timsbury Athletic | 14 | 4 | 1 | 9 | 19 | 32 | 0.594 | 9 | |
| 7 | Street | 14 | 2 | 3 | 9 | 18 | 29 | 0.621 | 7 | |
| 8 | Glastonbury | 14 | 2 | 2 | 10 | 8 | 35 | 0.229 | 6 | |

Rules for classification: The system of using goal average to separate two teams tied on points was used up to and including the 1976–77 season. The points system: 2 points for a win, 1 point for a draw and 0 points for losing.
(P) Promoted
