= 1939–40 Western Football League =

Western Football League
- Season: 1939–40
- Champions: Trowbridge Town

The 1939–40 season was the 43rd in the history of the Western Football League.

Upon the outbreak of World War II in 1939, many clubs left the Western League and it was reduced to a single division of eleven clubs. The champions for the first time in their history were Trowbridge Town, though they had won the old Division Two the previous season. This was the last season for the Western League until 1945–46, as all normal football activity was suspended during the war.

== Final Table ==
The league was reduced to a single division of eleven clubs after the departure of Bath City, Bristol City "A", Bristol Rovers Reserves and their "A" team, Frome Town, Lovells Athletic, Poole Town, Portland United, Salisbury City, Street, Torquay United Reserves, Warminster Town, Weymouth, and Yeovil and Petters United and their reserve team. Two new clubs joined the league:

- Bristol Aeroplane Company
- Peasedown Miners Welfare, rejoining after leaving the league as Peasedown St John in 1925.

Pos	Team	Pld	W	D	L	GF	GA	GR	Pts	Result
1	Trowbridge Town	20	18	0	2	87	31	2.806	36	
2	Bristol Aeroplane Company	20	13	4	3	78	33	2.364	30	
3	Radstock Town	20	12	1	7	68	54	1.259	25	
4	Peasedown Miners Welfare	20	9	5	6	45	36	1.250	23	
5	Glastonbury	20	9	5	6	49	43	1.140	23	Did not return to the league after the war
6	Bristol City Reserves	20	9	2	9	54	43	1.256	20	
7	Chippenham Town	20	7	2	11	51	78	0.654	16	
8	Welton Rovers	20	6	1	13	44	65	0.677	13	
9	Wells City	20	6	1	13	37	66	0.561	13	Did not return to the league after the war
10	Bath City Reserves	20	4	3	13	35	69	0.507	11	Did not return to the league after the war
11	Paulton Rovers	20	3	4	13	34	64	0.531	10	

Rules for classification: The system of using goal average to separate two teams tied on points was used up to and including the 1976–77 season. The points system: 2 points for a win, 1 point for a draw and 0 points for losing.
