= Bryan Bush =

English footballer

Personal information
- Date of birth: 25 April 1925
- Place of birth: Bristol, England
- Date of death: 25 August 2008 (aged 83)
- Height: 5 ft 8 in (1.73 m)
- Positions: Winger; inside forward

Youth career
- Longwell Green
- Oldland Juniors
- Bristol Boys

Senior career*
| Years | Team | Apps | (Gls) |
| 1945–1946 | Bristol City | 0 | (0) |
| 1946–1947 | Soundwell | | |
| 1947–1955 | Bristol Rovers | 114 | (19) |
| 1955–1956 | Trowbridge Town | | |
| 1956–1958 | Wells City | | |
| 1958–???? | Bitton | | |
- * Club domestic league appearances and goals

Bryan Bush (25 April 1925 – 25 August 2008) was an English professional footballer who played as a winger and inside forward for Bristol Rovers.

Prior to his footballing career, Bush had worked as a butcher in Bitton and as an engineer in the Fleet Air Arm, and he joined Bristol City as an amateur following the conclusion of World War II. Although he played for the city reserves, he never made the progression to their first team, and in 1946 he joined local side Soundwell.

Bush's single season spent with Soundwell was a successful one, and the club finished as runners-up in Division Two of the Western League. His performances were good enough to earn him a second spell with a Football League club, when he signed his first professional contract for Bristol Rovers in 1947. He remained with "The Pirates" for eight years, until 1955, making 114 league appearances and scoring 19 goals.

Following his departure from Bristol Rovers, Bush spent a single season with Trowbridge Town, before having an unsuccessful trial with Bath City in 1956. He then spent two years with Wells City before finishing his playing days with Bitton, the town where he had worked as a butcher at the start of his working life.

Later in life he had worked as a salesman, before dying from a stroke on 25 August 2008, at the age of 83.

== Sources ==
- Jay, Mike; Byrne, Stephen (1994). Pirates in Profile: A Who's Who of Bristol Rovers Players. Bristol: Potten, Baber & Murray. p. 38. ISBN 0-9524835-0-5.
- "Two former players pass away". Bristol Rovers Football Club. 29 August 2008. Archived from the original on 23 November 2008.
