= Len Hodges =

English footballer

Personal information
- Full name: Leonard Herbert Hodges
- Date of birth: 17 February 1920
- Place of birth: Bristol, England
- Date of death: 5 August 1959 (aged 39)
- Place of death: Bristol, England
- Positions: Inside forward; centre forward

Youth career
- Portway
- Bristol Boys

Senior career*
Years	Team	Apps	(Gls)
??????	Kingswood Aero Engineers		
????–1946	Soundwell		
1946–1950	Bristol Rovers	118	(20)
1950–1951	Swansea Town	2	(0)
1951–1953	Reading	6	(2)
1953–1954	Chippenham Town		
Total		126	(22)
- * Club domestic league appearances and goals

Leonard Herbert Hodges (17 February 1920 – 5 August 1959) was a professional footballer who played in The Football League for Bristol Rovers, Swansea Town (now known as Swansea City), and Reading between 1946 and 1953.

Hodges's entry into professional football was delayed by the Second World War, eventually joining his first professional club and his home town team Bristol Rovers in 1946 when he was aged 26. He scored five goals in each of his four seasons with The Pirates in 118 League games, and later played twice for Swansea Town and six times for Reading, where he was captain of their reserve team. He ended his career with non-League side Chippenham Town, retiring in 1954. He died just five years later, in 1959, at the age of 39 after developing meningitis.

== Sources ==
- Jay, Mike; Byrne, Stephen (1994). Pirates in Profile: A Who's Who of Bristol Rovers Players. Bristol: Potten, Baber & Murray. p. 122. ISBN 0-9524835-0-5.
