= Bristol Aeroplane Company F.C. =

Bristol Aeroplane Company
- Full name: Bristol Aeroplane Company Football Club
- Founded: prior to 1937
- Dissolved: after 1950
- 1949–50: Western League Division Two, 17/18

Bristol Aeroplane Company F.C. was an English football club based in Bristol, and was the works football team of the Bristol Aeroplane Company. The team played in the Western Football League before and after World War II, but left in 1950. They also participated in the FA Cup.

== League history ==
Joining the Western League in time for the final season of football before World War II, Bristol Aeroplane Company F.C. had a successful season, finishing as runners-up to champions Trowbridge Town. After the war they fared less well, gradually dropping down the top division before finishing bottom and being relegated to Division Two in 1947–48. Life in Division Two was equally tough, with the club finishing third bottom and second bottom in the final two seasons before leaving the league at the end of the 1949–50 season.

The club fielded a reserve side in Division Two of the Western League for two seasons, the second season being particularly unsuccessful. When the first team was relegated, the reserves were dropped.

Bristol Aeroplane Company F.C.'s six seasons of Western League football are listed below.

Season	Division	Position	W	D	L	F	A	Pts
1939–40	Western League	2 of 11	13	4	3	78	33	30
1945–46	Western League	9 of 14	10	4	12	62	81	24
1946–47	Western League, Division One	11 of 18	12	3	14	72	87	27
1947–48	Western League, Division One	18 of 18	4	1	29	56	165	9
1948–49	Western League, Division Two	16 of 18	9	5	20	74	109	23
1949–50	Western League, Division Two	17 of 18	3	6	25	43	138	12

=== Reserves ===
Season	Division	Position	W	D	L	F	A	Pts
1946–47	Western League, Division Two	10 of 13	6	3	14	50	76	15
1947–48	Western League, Division Two	18 of 18	2	1	31	48	157	5

== FA Cup history ==
Bristol Aeroplane Company F.C. entered the FA Cup for three consecutive seasons during the late 1940s, without scoring any goals. In their first Cup tie in 1947–48 they were defeated in the preliminary round 2–0 at Western League rivals Soundwell. They lost to local rivals again the following season, 1948–49, this time 4–0 at home to Hoffman Athletic in the Extra Preliminary Round. Their final attempt in 1949–50 resulted in a 3–0 Preliminary Round defeat at Troedyrhiw of the Welsh League.

Bristol Aeroplane Company F.C. won the Gloucestershire Senior Amateur Challenge Cup (South) in 1937–38 and 1942–43.
