= Soundwell =

Suburb of Bristol, England

Coordinates: 51.473°N 2.506°W

Soundwell, Bristol is a suburb of Bristol, England in the South Gloucestershire District. It is situated between Kingswood and Staple Hill.

Located centrally in the parish is St. Stephen's Anglican Church and St. Stephen's CofE junior & infants schools with approximately 300 pupils. The original junior & infants schools were relocated to their current Lansdown Road site in the 1970s and 1990s respectively, to allow for expansion of Soundwell College. Soundwell College was a college of further education, which merged with the City of Bristol College in the late 1990s, as the Soundwell Centre. The centre closed in 2015 and remained vacant until the early 2020s, when it was redeveloped as Soundwell Academy, for SEND students.

Soundwell was the home of Soundwell F.C. in the 1940s and 1950s. The current team, Soundwell Victoria, plays in the Bristol and District League. The team play home games at the Star Ground, the popular nickname of Soundwell Park. Located behind Kingswood Leisure Centre, a late 1980s redevelopment of Soundwell Swimming Baths, it is the only significant green space in the suburb. The Star Ground nickname originated from a nearby pub, 'The Star,' renamed 'The Turmpike' in the late 1980s, and that there had been a local cricket team which used the park as their ground. The cricket pavilion still exists, having been turned into a nursery when the cricket team vacated it, and more recently it has become the home of Bristol Rovers Supporters Junior Football Club.

Soundwell and surrounding areas were also coal-mining communities in days gone past and also were well known for shoe and boot manufacturing.

The name appears to be derived from Old English sund, meaning "healthy". There was once a healing well in the vicinity.
