= Soundwell F.C. =

Soundwell
- Full name: Soundwell Football Club
- Founded: 1946, 2013 (reformed)
- Ground: Kingswood Leisure Centre
- Capacity: 200 (all standing)

Soundwell Football Club was an association football club who played in Soundwell, near Bristol. The club is now defunct, but competed in the Western League and the FA Cup in the 1940s and 1950s.

In September 2012, people from one of the City of Bristol colleges made ideas of reforming the defunct Soundwell FC, plans were going into talks. In October 2013, the college had been granted funds, further talks will now go ahead and a decision should be made by the end of 2013.

Soundwell produced several young players who went on to become professionals, mostly with Bristol Rovers. Among their alumni are Geoff Bradford, who went on to play for England, as well as Bryan Bush, Len Hodges and Bobby Jones, who all played for Bristol Rovers, and Arnie White, who played for Bristol City.

== League record ==
Soundwell spent six seasons in the Western League, between 1945 and 1951. Their finishing position for each season is given in the table below.

| Season | Division | Pld | W | D | L | F | A | Pts | Pos |
|---|---|---|---|---|---|---|---|---|---|
| 1945–46 | Western League | 26 | 6 | 3 | 17 | 67 | 132 | 15 | 13/14 |
| 1946–47 | Western League, Division 2 | 24 | 17 | 3 | 4 | 111 | 44 | 37 | 2/13 |
| 1947–48 | Western League, Division 1 | 32 | 8 | 7 | 17 | 64 | 103 | 23 | 15/18 |
| 1948–49 | Western League, Division 1 | 34 | 13 | 5 | 16 | 76 | 100 | 31 | 12/18 |
| 1949–50 | Western League, Division 1 | 34 | 6 | 6 | 22 | 61 | 116 | 18 | 17/18 |
| 1950–51 | Western League, Division 2 | 38 | 6 | 3 | 29 | 46 | 166 | 15 | 19/20 |
