= Douglas F.C. =

Douglas
- Full name: Douglas Football Club
- Founded: 1903
- 1949–50: Western League Division Two, 18/18

Douglas F.C. was an English football club based in Kingswood, Bristol. They were the works team of the Douglas motorcycle factory, which later produced Vespa scooters under licence. The club was formed in 1903, and joined the Western Football League Division One in 1919–20, winning the title in their first season. However, they left the league soon after, and did not rejoin until the 1945–46 season. After finishing bottom of Division Two in 1949–50, they left the Western League. The club was affiliated to the Gloucestershire County FA.

The year after they left the Western League, they entered the FA Cup, but were beaten 5–0 at Clevedon in the preliminary round.

Douglas F.C. exists today in the form of Bendix F.C., members of the Bristol and District Football League.
