= Chippenham United F.C. =

English football club

Chippenham United
- Full name: Chippenham United Football Club
- Founded: prior to 1900
- Dissolved: 1962
- 1959–60: Western League Division Two, 5/14

Chippenham United F.C. was an English football club based in Chippenham, Wiltshire. The team played in the Western Football League for twelve seasons after World War II, but left in 1960. They also participated in the FA Cup for fourteen seasons.

== League history ==
Joining the Western League Division Two for the 1948–49 season, United won the division at their first attempt, gaining promotion to Division One. The following season, they finished above their local rivals Chippenham Town for what was to be the only time in the club's history. United's best league finish was in 1950–51, when they finished fourth, with Town in third position. The following seasons were less successful, and they only escaped relegation in 1955–56 due to expansion of Division One. However, the club was relegated in 1957–58 after finishing bottom of the table. The club dropped out of the Western League at the end of the 1959–60 season, and disbanded a couple of years later.

== FA Cup history ==
Chippenham United entered the FA Cup throughout the late 1940s and 1950s. During their first Cup run in 1948–49 they defeated Radstock Town before losing 2–1 at home to Trowbridge Town in the preliminary round. The following season they reached the first qualifying round, losing 3–0 at Clandown. Their best efforts in The FA Cup were in 1953–54 when they reached the fourth qualifying round, losing 3–1 at Newport (IOW); and in 1955–56 when they defeated four clubs before losing 6–2 to Salisbury, again in the fourth qualifying round. The club's last attempt in the competition was in 1961–62.
