= Poole Town F.C. =

English football club

Coordinates: 50°43′42″N 1°59′04″W

Poole Town
- Full name: Poole Town Football Club
- Nickname: The Dolphins
- Founded: 1890; 136 years ago (as Poole FC, a merger of Poole Rovers FC and Poole Hornets FC)
- Ground: Tatnam Ground
- Capacity: 3000
- Manager: Vacant
- League: Southern League Premier Division South
- 2025–26: Southern League Premier Division South, 4th of 22
Home colours	Away colours	Third colours

Poole Town Football Club is a football club based in Poole, Dorset, England. They currently compete in the Southern League Premier Division South. This is Step 3 of non-league therefore the 7th tier of English football. The club was established in 1880 and they affiliated to the Dorset County Football Association and are a Football Association (FA) Charter Standard Community Club. The team spent two seasons in the National League South before relegation in 2018. They are currently the highest ranked non-league team in Dorset, after both Weymouth and Dorchester were relegated to Step 4.

== History ==
=== Origins ===
Poole FC were formed when two local teams, Poole Hornets and Poole Rovers, merged in 1890. Both teams had been in existence since 1880. Poole joined the Dorset League in 1896, then the Hampshire League in 1903. The club enjoyed success in the Dorset Senior Cup in their early years, winning it for the fifth time in 1907.

After several seasons without football because of the First World War, the club began playing again in the 1919–20 season under the name Poole & St. Marys. They changed their name back to Poole FC after one season. Poole joined the Western League in 1923.

Poole won the Dorset Senior Cup again in 1926. The club also turned professional that year and joined the Southern Football League, Eastern Division. The 1926–27 season saw the club's best FA Cup run in its history. They reached the third round and played Everton, losing 3–1 at Goodison Park. They won the Dorset Senior Cup again in 1927 and reached the First Round of the FA Cup three consecutive seasons. Poole F.C. was unable to complete season 1929–30 in the Southern League due to financial difficulties and left four games unfulfilled. In May 1930, a deficit of £4,261 was reported and the club went into voluntary liquidation.

Two weeks later, a new club under the name of Poole Town FC was created. Poole rejoined the Western League in 1930 and stayed there (except for the 1934–35 season) until 1957.

=== Stadium ===
In 1933, Poole moved into Poole Stadium. They became known as Poole Town in 1934. Poole Town reached the First Round Proper of the FA Cup in 1946. They held Queens Park Rangers to a 2–2 draw before losing in the replay 6–0. They reached the first round again in 1963 and 1967, losing to Watford (after a replay) and Queens Park Rangers, respectively. The Main Stand at Poole Stadium was built by Club supporters for the Football Club in the 1950s. In 1994, the Dog Track was widened making the center green too small for a regulation pitch. Poole Town were obliged to move on and find a new home.

=== Nomadic days ===
In 1994, having been forced to leave Poole Stadium to make way for Poole Pirates speedway and greyhound racing Poole Town shared a ground with Hamworthy United for the 1995–96 season. They lost 39 consecutive matches, equalling the record set by Stockport County in 1977, and winning just 1 point from 42 league matches. The record was subsequently beaten by A.F.C. Aldermaston in 2010. Poole Town were relegated from the Southern League and joined the Hampshire League Division One, sharing a ground with Holt United.

Poole won the Dorset Senior Cup for the 12th time in 1998. They also won the Hampshire League Cup and finished third in the league. They won the league cup again in 1999 and finished second in the league but were not promoted. The Hampshire League Premier Division was created for the 2000–01 season but Poole could not join because they did not have sufficient ground grading. They were effectively relegated, staying in the first division.

In 2000, they were promoted into the Hampshire League Premier Division. They moved into Haskells Rec in Newtown but left after a few seasons due to vandalism.

=== Tatnam ===
In October 2000, Poole began playing at Tatnam, the school field of Oakdale South Road Middle School (now Oakdale Junior School). They subsequently built a permanent barrier around the pitch, hardstanding, floodlights, dugouts, a small club shop, tea hut, licensed bar, and an £80,000 stand which allowed them to be promoted into the Wessex League First Division.

In 2008, Poole Town submitted plans for the creation of a new £1.2 million ground at Branksome Recreation Ground which would enable them to meet strict FA criteria to gain promotion to the Southern League Division One. However, In December 2009, the Poole Borough Council Planning Committee turned the plans down due to loss of open space policy and no perceived community benefit. The club switched to plan B and were granted planning permission for a £2–3M development at Canford Magna, adjacent to Canford Park Arena. Although a privately funded 3G pitch was built on the Canford Land, no work commenced on the proposed new stadium and the plan was subsequently abandoned.

The 2008–09 season saw Poole win the Wessex Premier title and Dorset Senior Cup (beating Dorchester 2–0 aet). Poole Town were the second best team of 1,600 Football Association clubs in England, based on points per match, with the following record: played 42, won 38, drawn 2, lost 2. They were, however, denied promotion due to inadequate ground grading at that time.

In the 2009–10 season, Poole Town sold Charlie Austin to Swindon Town for an undisclosed sum.(estimated £180,000) Austin scored 46 goals in 46 games in his first season at Poole and 18 goals in 11 games before his transfer. He signed off with five goals in his last game against Moneyfields. Despite jumping six divisions, Austin continued scoring goals (eventually earning a transfer to Championship club Burnley and then Queens Park Rangers, playing at that time in the Premiership and with Charlie being one of the top scorers for the 2014–15 season). The 2009–10 season ended for Poole with another Wessex title but no promotion due to ground grading again.

During the 2010–11 season, Poole Town won the Wessex League Premier Division for the third consecutive season and reached the semi-final of the FA Vase and the Fourth Qualifying Round of the FA Cup. In contrast to previous seasons, the club were granted promotion to the Southern League after FA agreed to them staging Southern League football at Tatnam following a temporary upgrade of the facilities.

The 2012–13 season saw the club promoted as champions of Southern League Division One South and West to the Premier division. The club completed a treble that season by winning the Dorset Senior Cup when they beat Wimborne Town 4–1 in the final and the Southern League Champions Cup, beating Burnham away 0–1. The Dolphins were also voted the Southern League SWD1 club of the season.

The 2013–14 season saw Poole miss out on the playoffs by just one point, having had three points deducted for playing an ineligible player during one match earlier in the season. The 2014–15 season saw Poole Town win the (Red Insure) Southern League Cup, beating Corby in the two legged final (on away goals). However, Corby had the last laugh as Poole missed out on the Championship on the last day of the season losing 2–3 at home to Corby who were second at the start of play on goal difference. The game was watched by a Tatnam record 2,203 crowd. The match had been billed as "Winner takes all" and the defeat consigned Poole to the Playoffs, where they lost in the semi-final at home to St Neots Town.

Tatnam was upgraded again in 2013 with the dugouts moved opposite the Main Stand, a new clubhouse, a third turnstile, 100 more seats, including 50 in the small stand (which was moved), increased sizes for the dressing rooms, more toilets, and a new changing facility for the officials, as well as a new stand at the Fleetsbridge End. The total upgrade cost over £200,000 and was completed in just over two months. The grading allowed for promotion to the National League South which they achieved at the end of the 2015–16 season.

Poole immediately competed near the top of the National League South in their first season, but were dealt a blow as they were ruled ineligible for promotion due to a lack of 500 covered seats in their stadium. Poole went on to finish fifth, which would have otherwise qualified for the playoffs. Poole then struggled throughout the 2017–18 season, and found themselves on the final day as one of two teams fighting to stave off the final drop spot—along with the other team also passed over for the previous season's playoffs, Hungerford Town. A 2–0 Poole victory over Oxford City gave them hope, but ultimately Hungerford's narrow 1–0 win at East Thurrock United meant relegation to the Southern League South for the 2018–19 season.

The 2023-24 season saw a turbulent season for the Dolphins as long standing manager, Tom Killick was released from his duties. Ex-Bournemouth striker, Matt Tubbs, took the step up from Bashley to manage Poole Town. After a few months he walked away and was temporarily replaced by coach, James Ellis. During this time interviews for a new manager were taking place and the successful candidate was Steve Tully. He kept the Dolphins safe with a few games spare and made drastic changes to the squad in the summer of 2024.

The 2024-25 season saw further drama, as Tully departed the club in January 2025 after the Dolphins found themselves in a relegation battle.

The 2025-26 season saw the Dolphins enjoy a bounce back, securing a fourth place finish under their new joint management of Joe Lea and Pat Suraci. They kicked off their season campaign with a 6–0 opening victory and maintained strong momentum throughout the season. This was followed by a record-breaking average home attendance of 812 at Tatnam Ground. The Dolphins' campaign earned them a spot in the play-offs, where they were eventually defeated 3–2 in the semi final against Gloucester City.

The 2026-27 Season saw Josh Staunton come in as permanent manager.

== Ground ==
Poole Town play their games at The Clear Group Stadium on School Lane, Poole which has a capacity of 2,500.

In 2023, it was reported that the club's lease at The Clear Group Stadium was extended until December 2029.

The club continues to explore alternative ground locations with proposals recently being shared publicly detailing a potential community hub and stadium to be located in Creekmoor, Poole.

In the 2024/2025 season, attendances in the home games against Wimborne Town on Easter Monday and Dorchester Town on Boxing Day were 1,615 and 1,357, respectively.

It is reported the club is closing in on a 40 year lease keeping The Clear Group Stadium their home for another 4 decades.

Ground Name: Tatnam Ground

Old Sponsored Ground Name: The Black Gold Stadium

Current Sponsored Ground Name: The Clear Group Stadium

== Season to season ==
Season	Tier	Division	Place
2025-26	7th	Premier Division South	4th / 22
2024-25	7th	Premier Division South	14th / 22
2023-24	7th	Premier Division South	13th / 22
2022-23	7th	Premier Division South	4th / 22
2021-22	7th	Premier Division South	10th / 22
2020-21	7th	Premier Division South	Abandoned Due to Covid-19
2019-20	7th	Premier Division South	Abandoned Due to Covid-19
2018-19	7th	Premier Division South	5th / 22
2017-18	6th	National League South	20th / 22
2016-17	6th	National League South	5th / 22
2015-16	7th	Southern Premier Division	1st / 24
2014-15	7th	Southern Premier Division	2nd / 23
2013-14	7th	Southern Premier Division	7th / 23
2012-13	8th	Southern Division One South & West	1st / 22
2011-12	8th	Southern Division One South & West	2nd / 21
2010-11	9th	Wessex Premier Division	1st / 22
2009-10	9th	Wessex Premier Division	1st / 22
2008-09	9th	Wessex Premier Division	1st / 22
2007-08	9th	Wessex Premier Division	4th / 23
2006-07	10th	Wessex Premier Division	4th / 20
2005-06	11th	Wessex Division One	8th / 22
2004-05	12th	Wessex Division Two	2nd / 22

== 2025/2026 League Season ==
09 August 2025 1	Poole Town	1-0	Hanwell Town	Poole
15:00 BST	Harvey Slade (27')	Report		Stadium: Tatnam Ground; Attendance: 597; Referee: Thomas Farr

12 August 2025 2	Sholing	4-1	Poole Town	Sholing
19:45 BST	Dan Mason (13') Jake Hesketh (40') Gianni Crichlow (68') Vinnie Tume (81')	Report	Tyrrell Sampson (94')	Stadium: The Mortgage Decisions Stadium; Attendance: 581; Referee: Anthony Cross

16 August 2025 3	Bracknell Town	3-4	Poole Town	Sandhurst
15:00 BST	Jordan Esprit (47') (64') Francis Amartey (80')	Report	Ik Hill (36') Shaquille Gwengwe (52') (74') (96')	Stadium: Bottom Meadow; Attendance: 503; Referee: Charlie Bullock

23 August 2025 4	Poole Town	1-1	Evesham United	Poole
15:00 BST	Shaquille Gwengwe (71' pen)	Report	Andre Wright (72')	Stadium: Tatnam Ground; Attendance: 503; Referee: Tom Farlow

25 August 2025 5	Plymouth Parkway	1-1	Poole Town	Plymouth
15:00 BST		Report	Josh Staunton (85')	Stadium: Bolitho Park; Attendance: 614; Referee: Luke Mcfarlane

06 September 2025 6	Poole Town	1-0	Chertsey Town	Poole
15:00 BST	Shaquille Gwengwe (72')	Report		Stadium: Tatnam Ground; Attendance: 706; Referee: Jack Bromham

09 September 2025 7	Poole Town	2-2	Farnham Town	Poole
15:00 BST	Ik Hill (20') (93')	Report	Mat Mackenzie (43') Darryl Sanders (58' pen)	Stadium: Tatnam Ground; Attendance: 502; Referee: Jordan Mcritchie

20 September 2025 8	Hungerford Town	0-0	Poole Town	Hungerford
15:00 BST		Report		Stadium: Bulpit Lane; Attendance: 336; Referee: Harry Price

07 October 2025 9	Tiverton Town	1-2	Poole Town	Ian Moorcroft Stadium
19:45 BST	Asa Hall (50')	Report	Shaquille Gwengwe (13' pen) Ik Hill (28')	Stadium: Ladysmead; Attendance: 257; Referee: Mark Hickson

11 October 2025 10	Poole Town	6-0	Weymouth	Poole
15:00 BST	Antonio Diaz (1') Shaquille Gwengwe (22', 62' pen) Harvey Slade (48') Selim Saied (78') Ayo Faniyan (88')	Report		Stadium: Tatnam Ground; Attendance: 1,434; Referee: Jacob Wright

14 October 2025 11	Poole Town	2-0	Dorchester Town	Poole
19:45 BST	Antonio Diaz (21') Shaquille Gwengwe (60' pen)	Report		Stadium: Tatnam Ground; Attendance: 1,290; Referee: Jordan Mcritchie

18 October 2025 12	Gloucester City	3-2	Poole Town	Gloucester
15:00 BST	Joe Hanks (14') Aaron Wildig (15') King Baidoo (57')	Report	Shaquille Gwengwe (6' pen) Henry Spalding (84')	Stadium: Meadow Park; Attendance: 1,483; Referee: Jake Woolley

22 October 2025 13	Taunton Town	1-4	Poole Town	Taunton
19:45 BST	Jamie Richards (28')	Report	Harvey Slade (40') Shaquille Gwengwe (50, 59', 65' pen)	Stadium: Cygnet Health Care Stadium; Attendance: 357; Referee: Jack Bromham

01 November 2025 14	Poole Town	0-1	Gosport Borough	Poole
15:00 BST		Report	Daniel Wooden (66')	Stadium: Tatnam Ground; Attendance: 903; Referee: Nicholas Whittington

18 November 2025 15	Farnham Town	2-1	Poole Town	Farnham
19:45 BST	Beaux Booth (17'), Ogo Obi (94')	Report	Charlie Davis (8')	Stadium: The Memorial Ground; Referee: James Kerten

22 November 2025 16	Poole Town	1-0	Basingstoke Town	Poole
15:00 BST	Shaquille Gwengwe (21')	Report		Stadium: Tatnam Ground; Attendance: 464; Referee: Andrew Dunn

25 November 2025 17	Poole Town	5-5	Tiverton Town	Poole
19:45 BST	Shaquille Gwengwe (4' pen, 24' pen, 66'), Charlie Davis (19'), Ryan Campbell (35')	Report	Aiden Lee Horne (2', 16', 48'), Tor Joshua Swann (7'), Matthew Liam Wood (45')	Stadium: Tatnam Ground; Attendance: 473; Referee: Oscar Whiting

29 November 2025 18	Berkhamsted	1-2	Poole	Berkhamsted
15:00 BST	Sean Duodu (84')	Report	Samuel "Ayo" Faniyan (19'), Antonio Diaz (48')	Stadium: Glencar Community Stadium; Attendance: 409; Referee: Nick Reece

02 December 2025 19	Poole Town	2-2	Walton & Hersham	Poole
19:45 BST	Shaquille Gwengwe (41, 47' pen)	Report	Dawid Marcin Rogalski (10' pen), Ethan Christopher Light (81')	Stadium: Tatnam Ground; Attendance: 384; Referee: Jordan Mcritchie

06 December 2025 20	Havant & Waterlooville	0-3	Poole Town	Havant
15:00 BST		Report	Corey Jordan (45'), Shaquille Gwengwe (54'), Harvey Slade (76')	Stadium: Westleigh Park; Attendance: 688; Referee: Callum Peter

13 December 2025 21	Poole Town	3-1	Uxbridge	Poole
15:00 BST	Samuel "Ayo" Faniyan (8'), Shaquille Gwengwe (31'), Selim Saied (44')	Report	George Moore (71')	Stadium: Tatnam Ground; Attendance: 588; Referee: Josh Osofa

20 December 2025 22	Poole Town	0-1	Sholing	Poole
15:00 BST		Report	Byron Mason (57')	Stadium: Tatnam Ground; Attendance: 482; Referee: James Kerten

27 December 2025 23	Wimborne Town	0-2	Poole Town	Wimborne
15:00 BST		Report	Shaquille Gwengwe (29' pen, 61')	Stadium: The Wyatt Homes Stadium; Attendance: 2500; Referee: Daniel Trout

03 January 2026 24	Poole Town	7-0	Plymouth Parkway	Poole
15:00 BST	Selim Saied (8') Shaquille Gwengwe (27', 76', 80') Ik Hill (52') Ade Olumuyiwa (55') Antonio Diaz (89')	Report		Stadium: Tatnam Ground; Attendance: 718; Referee: Thomas Farr

10 January 2026 25	Hanwell Town	1-1	Poole Town	Greenford
15:00 BST	Dwayne Duncan (75')	Report	Shaquille Gwengwe (3')	Stadium: The Oliver Connell & Son Community Stadium; Attendance: 368; Referee: Callum Peter

17 January 2026 26	Poole Town	2-2	Yate Town	Poole
15:00 BST	Selim Saied (29') Shaquille Gwengwe (90' pen)	Report	Josh Bennett (55') Marlon Jackson (73' pen)	Stadium: Tatnam Ground; Attendance: 675; Referee: Oscar Whiting

24 January 2026 27	Walton & Hersham	1-2	Poole Town	Walton-on-Thames
15:00 BST	Jack Harry Wood (79')	Report	Ik Hill (8' pen) Samuel Ayo Faniyan (36')	Stadium: Elmbridge Xcel Sports Hub; Attendance: 1,024; Referee: Jordan Mcritchie

31 January 2026 28	Weymouth	2-0	Poole Town	Weymouth
15:00 BST	Brandon Goodship (6') Barney Stone (87')	Report		Stadium: Bob Lucas Stadium; Attendance: 1,769; Referee: Craig Scriven

07 February 2026 29	Poole Town	3-1	Hungerford Town	Poole
15:00 BST	Shaquille Gwengwe (28', 53') Harvey Slade (64')	Report	Carter Bowdery (71')	Stadium: Tatnam Ground; Attendance: 532; Referee: Andrew Dunn

14 February 2026 30	Basingstoke Town	1-2	Poole Town	Basingstoke
15:00 BST	Joe Grant (79')	Report	Dan Carr (5') Shaquille Gwengwe (90')	Stadium: Winklebury Stadium; Attendance: 679; Referee: Mitchell Terry

21 February 2026 31	Poole Town	3-1	Berkhamsted	Poole Town
15:00 BST	Samuel'Ayo' Faniyan (73') Shaquille Gwengwe (90'pen, 97')	Report	J J Lacey (66' pen)	Stadium: Tatnam Ground; Attendance: 658; Referee: Thomas Copping

28 February 2026 32	Poole Town	1-2	Gloucester City	Poole Town
15:00 BST	Shaquille Gwengwe (56')	Report	Rylie James Siddall (17') Roy Kane Simpson (57')	Stadium: Tatnam Ground; Attendance: 965; Referee: Robert Ablitt

07 March 2026 33	Dorchester Town	1-1	Poole Town	Dorchester
15:00 BST	Marcus Daws (59')	Report	Shaquille Gwengwe (53')	Stadium: The Avenue Stadium; Attendance: 1,677; Referee: Callum Waller

14 March 2026 34	Poole Town	2-1	Taunton Town	Poole
15:00 BST	Shaquille Gwengwe (47') Selim Saied (50')	Report	Dylan Jones (36')	Stadium: Tatnam Ground; Attendance: 816; Referee: Adrian Harris

21 March 2026 35	Gosport Borough	1-0	Poole Town	Gosport
15:00 BST	Bradley Tarbuck (45')	Report		Stadium: Privett Park; Attendance: 1,133; Referee: Patrick Nixon

24 March 2026 36	Yate Town	2-2	Poole Town	Yate
19:45 BST	Josh Bennett (36') Rex Mannings (42')	Report	Shaquille Gwengwe (12') Harvey Slade (78')	Stadium: South West Interiors Stadium; Attendance: 354; Referee: Daniel Lamport

28 March 2026 37	Poole Town	0-0	Bracknell Town	Poole
15:00 BST		Report		Stadium: Tatnam Ground; Attendance: 768; Referee: Thomas Copping

03 April 2026 38	Evesham United	1-1	Poole Town	Evesham
15:00 BST	Ethan Dunbar (28')	Report	Shaquille Gwengwe (50' pen)	Stadium: Spiers & Hartwell Jubilee Stadium; Attendance: 503; Referee: Richard Walker

06 April 2026 39	Poole Town	1-2	Wimborne Town	Poole
15:00 BST	Jamie Whisken (91')	Report	Rafa Ramos (39') Ethan Sills (43')	Stadium: Tatnam Ground; Attendance: 1,851; Referee: Jordan Mcritchie

11 April 2026 40	Chertsey Town	0-1	Poole Town	Chertsey Town
15:00 BST		Report	Billy Lowes (30')	Stadium: Alwyns Lane; Attendance: 668; Referee: John-Patrick Kane

18 April 2026 41	Poole Town	2-0	Havant & Waterlooville	Poole
15:00 BST	Shaquille Gwengwe (20', 44')	Report		Stadium: Tatnam Ground; Attendance: 1,747; Referee: Jack Bromham

25 April 2026 42	Uxbridge	3-3	Poole Town	West Drayton
15:00 BST	Josh Boorn (38') George Moore (49',60')	Report	Shaquille Gwengwe (27',39') Henry Spalding (75')	Stadium: Honeycroft; Attendance: 424; Referee: Adam Steele

29 April 2026 Play Off Semi-Final	Gloucester City	3–2	Poole Town	Gloucester
19:45 BST	Siddall (33') Hanks (86') O'Regan (112')	Report	Gwengwe (55') Slade (27')	Stadium: Meadow Park; Attendance: 2,400

== Players ==
Updated | 18 June 2026

=== Current squad ===
Note: Flags indicate national team as defined under FIFA eligibility rules; some limited exceptions apply. Players may hold more than one non-FIFA nationality.

No.	Pos.	Nation	Player
1	GK	ENG	Adam Parkes
3	DF	ENG	Ryan Campbell (Club Captain)
2	DF	ENG	Josh McCormick
5	DF	ENG	Harry Thomas (On Loan from Salisbury)
6	MF	ENG	Billy Lowes
7	MF	ENG	Jack Dickson
8	MF	ENG	Charlie Davis
9	FW	ITA	Ezio Touray
10	FW	ENG	Brandon Goodship
11	FW	ENG	IK Hill

No.	Pos.	Nation	Player
16	MF	TUN	Selim Saied
17	MF	ENG	Harvey Slade
18	DF	ENG	Corey Jordan
20	MF	ENG	Henry Spalding
22	MF	ENG	Antonio Diaz
23	DF	ENG	Owen Dore
25	FW	USA	Vaughn Covil (On Loan from Totton)
21	FW	ENG	Jake Lawrence
19	FW	ENG	Ben Seymour (Record Tranfer Fee)
12	MF	ENG	Luca Saunders
14	MF	ENG	Pietro Almeida (Dual Registration with New Milton FC)

== Backroom staff ==
- Manager: Vacant
- Assistant Manager: Steve Rutter
- Performance Analysts: James Crickmore
- Goalkeeping Coach: Chandler Hallett
- Assist Goalkeeping Coach: Fabian Rice
- Sports Rehabilitator and Therapist: Liv Bailey
- Strength and Conditioning Coach: Joe Wragg
- Head Kitman: Matt Reeds
- Assistant Kitmen: Dan Wilson & Si Thyer

== Club Officials ==
- Chairman: Chris Reeves
- Vice-Chairman: Andrew Rossiter
- Director: Pippa Daniels
- Director: John MacArthur
- Commercial Director: Bradley Williams
- Safety Officer: James Winchester
- Club Secretary: Lisa Cox
- Commercial Manager: Ben Edgell
- Head of Media: Connor Hannon
- Media volunteers: George Fullerton, Ollie Kemp, Dan Parker, Alfie Ward
- Photographers: Lauren Kelly, Dillon Smith
- Groundsman: Josh Staunton (Staunts on the Grass)
- Assistant Groundsman: Alan Fisher

== Honours ==
=== League honours ===
- Southern League Premier Division:
  - Winners (1): 2015–16
  - Runners-up (1): 2014–15
- Southern League Division One :
  - Runners-up (1): 1961–62
- Southern League Division One South :
  - Runners-up (1): 1989–90
- Southern League Division One South & West:
  - Winners (1): 2012–13
  - Runners-up (1): 2011–12
- Western League :
  - Winners (1): 1956–57
  - Runners-up (4): 1946–47, 1949–50, 1953–54, 1955–56
- Wessex League Premier Division :
  - Winners (3): 2008–09, 2009–10, 2010–11
- Wessex League Division Two:
  - Runners-up (1): 2004–05
- Hampshire League Premier Division:
  - Runners-up (2): 1998–99, 2000–01
- Hampshire League Division One:
  - Winners (1): 1999–2000

=== Cup honours ===
- Dorset Senior Cup:
  - Winners (18): 1894–95, 1896–97, 1898–99, 1901–02, 1903–04, 1906–07, 1925–26, 1926–27, 1937–38, 1946–47, 1974–75, 1988–89, 1997–98, 2008–09, 2012–13, 2013–14, 2018–19, 2021–22, 2022–23
  - Runners-up (19): 1890–91, 1892–93, 1895–96, 1897–98, 1899–1900, 1900–01, 1910–11, 1927–28, 1932–33, 1936–37, 1948–49, 1950–51, 1961–62, 1987–88, 1992–93, 1993–94, 1994–95, 2003–04, 2005–06
- Western Football League Cup:
  - Winners (1): 1954–55
- Wessex League Cup:
  - Runners-up (1): 2009–10
- Trophyman Cup:
  - Winners (2): 1997–98, 1998–99
- Southern League Champions Cup:
  - Winners (1): 2012–13
- Southern League Cup (Red Insure):
  - Winners (1): 2014–15

== Records ==
- Highest (old) league position: 16th Southern League Premier Division – 1966–67
- Highest (recent) league position: 5th National League South – 2016–2017
- Lowest league position: 1st Hampshire League Division One
- Best FA Cup run: 3rd Round Proper – 1926
- FA Trophy best performance: Second Round 2020–21
- FA Vase best performance: Semi-final 2010–11
- Largest home crowd (Poole Stadium): 6,575 vs Watford in the FA Cup 1st round replay – 1963
- Largest home crowd (Tatnam Ground): 2,203 vs Corby Town – 2014–15
- Biggest home win: 10–0 vs Horndean – 2009
- Biggest away win: 11–0 vs Horndean – 1998
- Record transfer fee (Paid): Ben Seymour (Undisclosed substantial fee) – 3 November 2026
- Record transfer fee (Received): Charlie Austin (Undisclosed – est. £180,000) – 2009
- Beat Weymouth 6-0: 11/10/25

== Supporters ==
Poole Town were one of the top seven best supported teams in the Southern Premier League with the highest League attendance of the 2014–15 season with 2,203 finishing the season with an average of 458 across all League games. The official mascot is Dylan The Dolphin. The Dolphins support continues to grow with a mix of young and old faces that turn up in their numbers week in week out.

== Notable former players ==
- Charlie Austin
- Sam Surridge
- Christian Saydee
- Daniel Adu-Adjei
- Remy Rees-Dottin
- Shaquille Gwengwe (The GOAT)
- Nathaniel Chioma

== Poole Town Ladies ==
The ladies team compete in the Regen Arable South West Regional Women's Football League and predominately play their home games at The Dorset Country Ground in Hamworthy.

The ladies are managed by ...

On 16 February 2025 the ladies played at Tatnam for the first time in over 5 years versus Sherborne Town Ladies. The match featured live commentary of a ladies game on Poole Town's social media for the first time ever. Sherborne Town Ladies ran out 2-1 winners in what proved to be both an entertaining and close game, with Poole Town's Emma King being named as player of the match.
