= Stonehouse Town F.C. =

Association football club in England

Coordinates: 51°45′10.06″N 2°17′19.02″W

Stonehouse Town
- Full name: Stonehouse Town Football Club
- Nickname: Magpies
- Founded: 1898
- Ground: Magpies Stadium, Stonehouse
- Chairman: Nigel Sanders
- Manager: Adam Coyle
- League: Hellenic League Division One
- 2025–26: Hellenic League Division One, 4th of 18
Home colours	Away colours

Stonehouse Town Football Club is a football club based in Stonehouse, Gloucestershire, England. They are currently members of the Hellenic League Division One and play at the Magpies Stadium.

== History ==
The club was established in 1898. They joined the Dursley & District League, and were champions in 1900–01. After moving to the Stroud & District League, the club were champions in 1908–09. After World War I they also entered a team in the North Gloucestershire League. In the Stroud & District League the club were champions in 1919–20 and 1920–21, whilst in the North Gloucestershire League they won the title in 1919–20 and finished as runners-up in the next two seasons. In 1922 the club were founder members of the Gloucestershire Northern Senior League, which they played in until 1927. After winning the Stroud League title again in 1927–28, the club returned to the Gloucestershire Northern Senior League in 1931 and were champions in 1934–35, 1935–36 and 1936–37 (also winning the Gloucestershire Senior Amateur Cup in the latter season), before finishing as runners-up in 1938–39.

In 1947 Stonehouse moved up to Division Two of the Western League. They were Division Two champions in 1950–51, earning promotion to Division One. However, after finishing second-from-bottom of Division One in 1953–54, the club were relegated back to Division Two. Despite finishing as runners-up in the division in 1959–60, the club dropped into Division One of the Wiltshire League. They were Wiltshire League champions in 1967–68, after which the club became founder members of the Gloucestershire County League.

Stonehouse were the inaugural champions of the Gloucestershire County League and won the Gloucestershire Senior Amateur Cup in 1972–73, but finished bottom of the league in 1975–76, 1976–77, 1980–81, 1981–82, 1982–83 and 1983–84. After finishing last for a sixth time in 1987–88, the club left the league and returned to the Gloucestershire Northern Senior League. In 2008–09 they were Division Two champions, earning promotion to Division One. The club were Gloucestershire Senior Amateur Cup winners and Division One runners-up, earning promotion back to the Gloucestershire County League. Following a third-place finish in the Gloucestershire County League, they were promoted to Division One West of the Hellenic League.

== Ground ==
The club originally played at the Recreation Ground on Regent Street. In 1949 they moved to Oldends Lane, with the ground officially opened on 25 August 1949 by England captain Billy Wright prior to a friendly match against Cheltenham Town.

== Honours ==
- Western League
  - Division Two champions 1950–51
- Gloucestershire County League
  - Champions 1968–69
- Wiltshire League
  - Division One champions 1967–68
- Gloucestershire Northern Senior League
  - Champions 1934–35, 1935–36, 1936–37
  - Division Two champions 2008–09
- North Gloucestershire League
  - Champions 1919–20
- Stroud & District League
  - Champions 1908–09, 1920–21, 1927–28
- Dursley & District League
  - Champions 1900–01
- Gloucestershire Senior Amateur Cup
  - Winners 1936–37, 1972–73, 2015–16
- Gloucestershire Northern Senior Challenge Cup
  - Winners 1953–54

== Records ==
- Best FA Cup performance: Second qualifying round, 1950–51, 1958–59, 1965–66, 1966–67, 1969–70, 1971–72, 1973–74
- Best FA Trophy performance: First round, 1969–70
- Best FA Vase performance: Second round, 1975–76
- Record attendance: 5,500 vs Gloucester City, FA Cup second qualifying round, 29 September 1951
