= Hoffman Athletic F.C. (Stonehouse) =

Hoffman Athletic
- Full name: Hoffman Athletic Football Club
- Founded: prior to 1946
- Dissolved: after 1960
- 1958–59: Western League Division Two, 16/17

Hoffman Athletic F.C. was an English football club based in Stonehouse, Gloucestershire, and was one of the works football teams of the Hoffman's Bearings Company. The team played in the Western Football League for thirteen seasons after World War II, but left in 1959. They also participated in the FA Cup, and were managed by Hoffman's Production Manager and former RAF Bomber Command radio operator, Bill Clark.

The other Hoffman's works football team was also called Hoffman Athletic, and was based at the company's main factory in Chelmsford, Essex.

== League history ==
Joining the Western League Division Two for the 1946–47 season, Hoffman Athletic's best years were the first three, which saw the club finish in sixth position each season. However, Athletic dropped down the division and finished bottom in the 1952–53 season. A recovery meant they finished 11th the following season, but they never again managed to achieve a top ten finish. The club dropped out of the Western League at the end of the 1958–59 season, joining Division Two of the Gloucestershire Northern Senior League, which they won at the first attempt.

Hoffman Athletic also won the Gloucestershire Senior Amateur Challenge Cup (North) in 1951–52 and 1953–54.

== FA Cup history ==
Hoffman Athletic entered the FA Cup for five consecutive seasons during the late 1940s and early 1950s. During their first Cup run in 1946–47 they defeated Frome Town, Paulton Rovers, Clandown and Melksham before losing 4–3 at home to Trowbridge Town in the third qualifying round. This was their best effort in The FA Cup, as they subsequently never managed to reach further than the first qualifying round, which they achieved in 1950–51, when they lost 7–0 at Merthyr Tydfil.
