= Glastonbury F.C. =

Association football club in England

Coordinates: 51°09′15″N 2°43′26″W

Glastonbury
- Full name: Glastonbury Football Club
- Nickname: The Dollies
- Founded: 1890
- Ground: Abbey Moor Stadium, Glastonbury
- Capacity: 800
- League: Somerset County League Division One
- 2025–26: Somerset County League Division One, 13th of 15
Home colours

Glastonbury F.C. is a football club based in Glastonbury, England. The club is affiliated to the Somerset County FA. The club are currently members of the Somerset County League Division One and play at the Abbey Moor Stadium.

== History ==
The club was founded in 1890 and was originally called Glastonbury Avalon Rovers. After the turn of the century, the club entered the FA cup for the first time in the 1902–03 season, and had changed their name to Glastonbury. The club were playing in the East Somerset Football League at the beginning of the twentieth century, winning the league in the 1904–05 and 1912–13 campaigns. The club gained its first cup silverware when they lifted the Somerset Junior cup in the 1912–13 competition and retained this cup the following season.

After the First World War, the club joined Division two of the Western Football League, for the 1919–20 season. They stayed in this division for three seasons until the Western league decided to disband the second division. The club then played in the Bristol & District and Bristol Suburban Leagues until rejoining Division two of the Western League again for the 1931–32 campaign. Four seasons later, the club took home the Somerset Senior Cup when they beat Keynsham Town 4–2 in the final.

When football returned to the country after the Second World War, the club joined Division one of the Western league for the 1946–47 season, and two seasons later won the league. The club that year also completed a double by winning the Somerset Premier Cup. The club would then have further success by winning the league again two seasons later in the 1950–51 competition. To cap it all the Club reached the First Round proper of the FA Cup in that season when 4,000 spectators crowded into Abbey Park to watch their team narrowly lose to Exeter City 2–1. The club would then have to wait 15 more years for silverware when they picked up the Western League Challenge Cup in the 1965–66 season. Four seasons later in 1969/70 the club became Western League champions again for the third time.

The club remained in the top division of the Western league until the end of the 1978–79 campaign when they finished bottom of the Premier Division and were relegated to Division one. Glastonbury moved to their current home of the Abbymore stadium in 1982. The club would remain in the Western First division until the end of the 1998–99 campaign, with their best season during this time being the 1994–95 competition when they finished as runners-up but were denied promotion as their ground did not meet the standard required for the Premier Division. The 1998–99 campaign saw the club finish eighteenth out of 19 teams and they were relegated to the Somerset County Football League Premier Division.

Their first season in the Somerset County Football League saw the club face relegation again, when they finished second from bottom. They would face further relegation when, at the finish of the 2002–03 season, they came second from bottom. The club spent two seasons in Division two before gaining promotion back to one as runners-up at the end of the 2004–05 competition. The club then followed this success the next season with promotion back to the premier division. The club remained in the Premier Division until the end of the 2011–12 season, when, after losing 15 games in a row, they were relegated to division one. The 2012–13 season saw the club relegated again for a second successive season.

The start of the 2013–14 campaign saw the club change their name to a more traditional Glastonbury FC. The league was restructured during the following summer, and following a third-placed finish Glastonbury were promoted to the Somerset County Division One West division. Seventh and eighth-placed finishes followed and in 2016-17 the Dollies survived the drop on the final weekend of the season. Another league restructure meant, despite finishing ninth in 2017–18, Glastonbury dropped into Division Two of the Somerset County League.

== Ground ==
Glastonbury play their home games at the Abbey Moor Stadium, Glastonbury, Somerset BA69AF.

The club moved to this ground in 1982, and originally had a greyhound track, which was covered up in 2000 but reopened from 2005 until 2006.

== Honours ==
=== League honours ===
- Western Football League Premier Division :
  - Winners (3): 1948–49, 1950–51, 1969–70
  - Runners-up (2): 1947–48, 1951–52
- Western Football League Division One:
  - Runners-up (1): 1994–95
- Somerset County League Division Two:
  - Runners-up (1): 2004–05
- East Somerset Football League Champions:
  - Winners (2): 1904–05, 1912–13

=== Cup honours ===
- Somerset Professional Cup:
  - Winners (2): 1937–38, 1948–49
- Somerset Senior Cup:
  - Winners (1): 1935–36
- Western Football League Challenge Cup:
  - Winners (1): 1965–66
- Western Football League Alan Young Cup:
  - Winners (3): 1967–68 (shared with Minehead), 1968–69(shared with Bridgwater Town), 1970–71
- Somerset Charity Challenge Cup:
  - Winners (1): 1932–33
- Somerset Junior Cup:
  - Winners (2): 1912–13, 1913–14
- Clark Challenge Cup:
  - Winners (2): 2006–07 2014–15

== Records ==
- Highest league position: 1st in Western League premier Division 1948–49, 1950–51, 1969–70
- FA Cup best performance: First round 1950–51
- FA Trophy best performance: First round 1969–70
- FA Vase best performance: First round 1992–93

== Former players ==
1. Players that have played/managed in the football league or any foreign equivalent to this level (i.e. fully professional league).
2. Players with full international caps.
3. Players that have achieved success as a player/manager in other sports.
- (England) Jack Pattison
- (England) Paul Randall
- (England) David Stone
- (Wales) Ken Wookey
