= Dorchester Town F.C. =

Association football club in England

Dorchester Town
- Full name: Dorchester Town Football Club
- Nicknames: The Magpies; Dorch
- Founded: 1880; 146 years ago
- Ground: The Avenue Stadium, Dorchester
- Capacity: 5,229 (710 seated)
- Chairman: Scott Symes
- Manager: Glenn Howes
- League: Southern League Division One South
- 2025–26: Southern League Premier Division South, 20th of 22 (relegated)
- Website: dorchestertownfc.co.uk
Home colours	Away colours

Dorchester Town Football Club is a semi-professional association football club based in Dorchester, Dorset, England. They currently compete in the Southern League Division One South, the eighth level of the English football league system.

Nicknamed the Magpies due to their black and white strip, they play their home matches at the Avenue Stadium, on land owned by the Duchy of Cornwall. The club is an FA Chartered Standard club affiliated with the Dorset County Football Association.

== History ==
The history of the club can be traced back to 1871, but the club in its current format was founded (reformed) on Monday 18 October 1880 as Dorchester Football Club, playing home games at The Recreation Ground on Weymouth Avenue. Dorchester were Dorset Senior Cup finalists in 1888 and 1890, before joining the Dorset League in 1896. The club struggled for many years due to the importance of the town's market impacting player availability on Saturdays and, in 1908/09, the club imposed a policy of only playing fellow clubs from Dorchester and visiting military teams. This policy lasted for one season, and on 26 August 1910, Dorchester FC, Dorchester Wanderers, Dorchester United, Dorchester Athletic, and Dorchester Rovers came together to create "a team worthy of the good old town of Dorchester". The newly merged team became known as Dorchester Town Football Club.

In 1929 the club moved from the Recreation Ground but remained on Weymouth Avenue, on land which became known as the Avenue Football Ground.

Despite being founder members of the Dorset League, the club had little success before winning the championship in 1937/38 with a 2–0 victory at Sherborne on 25 April 1938. The club joined the Western League in 1947, winning promotion from Division Two in 1950, and going on to take the league championship in 1954/55. The fifties proved to be a successful decade for the Magpies, winning the Dorset Senior Cup for the first time in 1951, and having a number of good runs in the FA Cup, facing the likes of Norwich City, Queens Park Rangers, Port Vale, and Plymouth Argyle. In 1954, Dorchester reached the 2nd Round before eventually losing out to York City in front of 5,500 fans at the Avenue ground. York went on to reach the semi-finals.

Following four more victories in the Dorset Senior Cup, the club entered the Southern League (Division One South) in 1972. They first tasted success in this division when they finished runners-up to Margate in 1977/78, going unbeaten in the final 16 matches of the season, with manager David Best utilizing his links with his old club AFC Bournemouth to attract former first-teamers such as John O'Rourke, Jack Howarth, and Harry Redknapp to the Avenue.

The formation of the Alliance League (now the National League) unfortunately meant the Magpies returned to the reformed Southern Division a year later, but the club celebrated its centenary by winning the Southern Division in 1979/80 by a one-point margin over Aylesbury. Stuart Bell succeeded David Best as manager during the season, and the Magpies went unbeaten in the last 14 games to clinch the title. A young Trevor Senior impressed alongside ever-present top scorer Paul Thorne, whilst Graham Roberts joined neighbours Weymouth early in the campaign for £6,000 before going on to star for Tottenham Hotspur and England.

Senior stayed with Dorchester for a further two seasons, before signing for Portsmouth during the 1981/82 season for £35,000, going on to play for Watford, Middlesbrough and Reading, where he broke the Berkshire club's all-time goalscoring record. Before leaving the Magpies, Senior helped the club reach the 2nd Round of the FA Cup again before losing out to AFC Bournemouth in a replay at Dean Court in front of a crowd of 8,700. A goal four minutes from the end of extra time was enough to end Dorchester's dreams of a place in the third round – a feat they have still yet to achieve.

Relegated at the end of the 1983/84 season following a severe financial crisis, the club only just avoided dropping out of the league altogether the following year. However, a remarkable turnaround followed and Dorchester returned to the Premier Division as champions at the end of the 1986/87 season, taking the title following a goalless draw at runners-up Ashford on the final day of the season.

Having come so close to losing the club in the late eighties, Chairman Peter Aiken and the board realised that the Avenue Ground had begun to outlive its purpose and brokered a deal with Tesco and the landowners, the Duchy of Cornwall, to develop a new stadium for the club. Again positioned on Weymouth Avenue, Dorchester moved into the newly constructed Avenue Stadium in 1990 and opened their first league campaign at the stadium with a 3-2 victory over Worcester City, despite having goalkeeper Jeremy Judd sent off early on and having right-back Peter Morrell playing in goal for much of the game.

The move saw Dorchester establish themselves as a Southern Premier team in the early nineties before Stuart Morgan was introduced as manager in 1993. Morgan took the club to sixth in the league in 1994/95, guided Dorchester to the last 16 of the FA Trophy for only the second time in 1996/97, and followed that with a fourth-placed finish in the league in 1997/98.

In the following seasons, the Magpies were unable to rekindle the same form and, following a number of close shaves at the wrong end of the table, the club was relegated to the Eastern Division at the end of the 2000/01 season, despite a strong FA Cup run culminating in a 3–1 First Round defeat at Wigan Athletic's 25,000 all-seater JJB Stadium.

Under the guidance of manager Mark Morris, Dorchester's young squad regained their Premier Division status within two years, defeating King's Lynn on the final day of the 2002/03 season to take the Eastern Division title ahead of Eastbourne Borough, having won 16 of their last 17 matches and scoring 114 goals in their 42 league games. A season earlier the Magpies had picked up the Southern League Cup for the first time, again defeating King's Lynn in a 4–0 aggregate victory in the final.

The first season back in the Premier Division was a difficult one but the club reached the end-of-season play-offs, where two fine victories over Bath City and Tiverton Town saw Dorchester become a Conference club for the first time in the newly formed Conference South division. A season later the Magpies almost saw further play-off glory, but missed out on another promotion opportunity on the final day of the season, going down 7–3 at Bognor Regis Town.

A mid-table finish the following year ended with the resignation of Mark Morris, with Mick Jenkins taking charge of the first team. Despite the club's tenth success in the Dorset Senior Cup, Jenkins' reign was short-lived, and the club subsequently went through a handful of managers as they had a number of seasons battling relegation. In 2012, former Dorchester player and Reserve Team Manager Phil Simkin took charge of the team, guiding the Magpies in the 2012/13 season to their greatest FA Cup giant-killing as they beat League Two side Plymouth Argyle 1-0 in the 1st Round to set up a 2nd Round tie for the third time in the club's history. On this occasion Luton Town were their opponents, with the Magpies falling to a narrow 2-1 defeat. Simkin would lead Dorchester to an eighth place finish in Conference South the following season, before financial difficulties hit the club and they were subsequently relegated back to the Southern League in 2014.

In 2015 the club became a Community Benefit Society, allowing fans to become part-owners of the club with no individual able to purchase more than one share. The move was to allow Dorchester to become financially sustainable, centred in the community and run by a collective of fans as opposed to one individual having sole or majority ownership.

On the pitch, a number of managers - including club record appearance holder Mark Jermyn - came and went as the Magpies would regularly battle relegation from the Southern League Premier. This run would change when former player Glenn Howes returned to the club as manager in October 2021. Two years later Howes invited Tom Killick - an Avenue cult hero in his playing days - to take over as first team manager with Howes as his number two. The pair led Dorchester to a ninth place finish in the 2023/24 season, before reaching the play-offs the following year. The Magpies would lose out to eventual winners AFC Totton in the semi-finals, falling 4-3 to a last-minute goal in extra-time.

Howes departed that summer and with a number of players also moving on, the Magpies failed to reach the same heights in the 2025/26 season. Killick stepped down in February 2026, with player-coach Wes Fogden taking control as Interim First Team Manager. Despite an initial up-turn in form, Dorchester were unable to save their season and were relegated to Division One South on 18 April 2026 following a 0-0 draw with Hungerford Town.

On 1 May 2026, Glenn Howes returned to Dorchester as first team manager.

== Community Ownership ==
Operating as a Community Benefit Society since 2015 (registered as Dorchester Town Community Football Club Limited), the club is a democratically run, not-for-profit community-owned organisation, run by its supporters. Fans can become members, own a part of the club, and have a say in its running, adhering to a model where football belongs to the community. The structure focuses on sustainability and community involvement rather than private profit, and Dorchester are recognised as a fan-owned club within the Football Supporters' Association directory.

== Colours and crest ==
The club has a long tradition of playing their home matches in black and white striped shirts with black shorts and socks, though did have a brief spell wearing cherry, white and blue between 1921 and 1926. For the 2005–06 season, to celebrate the club's 125th anniversary, the team sported a black and white quartered home shirt, similar to the original strip from the club's founding.

The away kit has taken on differing colours over the years, including yellow, red, white and sky blue. Currently the away strip is all royal blue. The third kit is all purple, a nod to the symbolic royal purple on the town’s coat of arms.

The club's crest was designed in 1948 by Jack Lawrence, an assistant secretary at the club. He designed the pair of magpies with their "tails up" and set them on a light blue background to represent the sky. Over the years this colouring has changed - first to green, and then to red during the 1970s and 1980s, to represent the club's away colours at the time.

The most significant change came in March 1989 when the club was granted the right to incorporate the Town Seal onto the crest by Dorchester Town Council. The Seal of Dorchester dates back to 1370 and bears the arms of both England and France due to the fact that a number of men from the town fought at the Battle of Agincourt and gained the right to retain the seal in its then form. When Henry IV altered the French arms from four fleur-de-lys to three in 1405, Dorchester declined to change and still bears the original to this date.

The addition of the Town Seal coincided with the club's move to the new Avenue Stadium, and the club used the occasion to revert back to the original sky blue background which has remained in place ever since.

== Stadium ==
Dorchester Town play their home games at the Avenue Stadium, Weymouth Avenue, Dorchester, Dorset, DT1 2RY.

The Avenue Stadium is located on the southern outskirts of Dorchester. Opened in 1990, it consists of one main stand, which is all-seated, and three small banks of terracing, which are all-standing. A railway line runs behind the stadium. Whilst the capacity of the stadium is 5,229, Dorchester tends to attract crowds of around 600–700 although, during the 1990s, the club regularly achieved 900–1000 attendances.

The first match to take place at the stadium was a pre-season friendly against Exeter City, who triumphed 2-0. The first competitive game was a 3-2 league victory over Worcester City, whilst the official opening of the stadium took place two months later in October 1990 when the Magpies took on Chelsea in a friendly match, with the Blues winning 4-1.

The record attendance at the Avenue Stadium came on 1 January 1999, when a crowd of 4,159 watched the Dorset Derby against local rivals Weymouth. A crowd of 4,029, the second-highest attendance at the stadium, watched the same derby on 27 December 2025.

The Avenue Stadium featured on live television for the first time in 2013/14, when Dorchester faced Plymouth Argyle in the FA Cup - a game where 3,196 fans were in attendance. Dorchester beat their higher league opponents 1–0 in a match which was televised live by ESPN in the UK and Fox Network in the USA.

== Players and personnel ==
=== First Team ===
As of 10 November 2026

Note: Flags indicate national team as defined under FIFA eligibility rules; some limited exceptions apply. Players may hold more than one non-FIFA nationality.

No.	Pos.	Nation	Player
1	GK	ENG	Ryan Hall
2	DF	DMA	Harvey-Joe Bertrand
3	DF	ENG	Ollie Haste
4	DF	ENG	Will Spetch
5	DF	ENG	Ieuan Turner
6	MF	ENG	Tom Purrington
8	MF	ENG	Corby Moore
9	FW	ENG	Ethan Taylor
10	MF	ENG	Matt Buse
11	FW	ENG	Matty Burrows
12	DF	IRL	Tega Agberhiere (dual-registered with Moneyfields)
13	GK	ENG	Dale Hind (dual-registered with Wincanton Town)
14	MF	ENG	Jack Winsor

No.	Pos.	Nation	Player
15	FW	ENG	Ilya Ihnatenko (dual-registered with Eastleigh)
16	DF	ENG	Jay Williams
17	FW	AUS	Hassan Jalloh
18	FW	NGR	Ibby Olateju (on loan from AFC Totton)
19	FW	POR	Rafa Ramos
20	FW	POL	Olaf Koszela
21	GK	ENG	Will Seeley
22	DF	ENG	Liam McFarlane (dual-registered with Eastleigh)
23	FW	VGB	Kyran Samadi (dual-registered with Bashley)
24	FW	ENG	Fin Murray (dual-registered with Horndean)

=== Under 23s ===
As of 28 September 2026

Note: Flags indicate national team as defined under FIFA eligibility rules; some limited exceptions apply. Players may hold more than one non-FIFA nationality.

No.	Pos.	Nation	Player
—	GK	ENG	Charlie Grice
—	DF	ENG	Calum Best
—	DF	ENG	Jack Foden
—	DF	ENG	Joshua Grace
—	DF	ENG	Jonas Guthrie
—	DF	VGB	Aaron Matthews
—	DF	ENG	Jayden Sault
—	DF	ENG	Isaac Stanley
—	DF	ENG	Dan Stoodley
—	MF	ENG	Pietro Almeida
—	MF	ENG	Charlie Beynon

No.	Pos.	Nation	Player
—	MF	ENG	Ethan Frias-Robles
—	MF	ENG	Karlos Gregory
—	MF	ENG	Denzil Gurung
—	MF	ENG	Luc Rukiza
—	MF	ENG	Morrison Wright
—	FW	ENG	David Bowmaster
—	FW	ENG	Taylor Broadley
—	FW	ENG	Owen Kemp
—	FW	ENG	Benedict Rukiza
—	FW	ENG	Lewis Valentine

=== Coaching staff ===
As of 18 July 2026

Job Title	Name
First Team Manager	Glenn Howes
First Team Coach	Jason Brookes
First Team Coach	Brian Churchill
First Team Goalkeeping Coach	Steve Dodge
Sports Therapist	Lewis Carolan
U23 Team Manager	Dan Neville

== Honours ==
- Southern League Eastern Division
  - 2003–04 Champions
- Southern League Southern Division
  - 1979–80 & 1986–87 Champions
  - 1977–78 Runners up
- Southern League Cup
  - 2001–02 Winners
  - 1991–92 Runners up
- Southern League Challenge Trophy
  - 2002–03 Winners
- Western League Division One
  - 1954–55 Champions
  - 1960–61 Runners up
- Western Football League Professional Cup
  - 1960–61 & 1961–62 Runners up
- Western Football League Alan Young Cup:
  - Winners (1): 1961–62
- Dorset Senior Cup
  - 1950–51, 1960–61, 1967–68, 1968–69, 1971–72, 1993–94, 1995–96, 2000–01, 2002–03, 2006–07, 2010–11, 2011–12

== Club records ==
Cup runs

- Best FA Cup performance: 2nd round (1954–55, 1981–82, 2012–13)
- Best FA Trophy performance: 3rd round (1971–72, 1996–97, 2003–04)

Points in a season

- Most – 93 in 42 games (2.21 points/game). (Southern League Division One East, 2002–03)
- Least – 20 in 38 games (0.53 points/game). (Southern League Premier Division, 1983–84)

Wins in a season

- Most – 28 in 42 games. (Southern League East, 2002–03)
- Least – 4 in 38 games. (Southern League Premier Division, 1983–84)

Draws in a season

- Most – 18 in 46 games. (Southern League South, 1981–82)
- Most – 18 in 42 games.(Southern League South Premier 2024-25)
- Least – 2 in 36 games. (Western League Division 1, 1958–59 and 1959–60)

Defeats in a season

- Most – 27 in 40 games. (Southern League South, 1985–86)
- Least – 5 in 42 games. (Southern League East, 2002–03)
- Least – 5 in 42 games. (Southern league South Premier 2024-25)

The same number of drawn games occurred in the Western League Division Two, 1949–50, but the club played only 30 games.

Goals in a season

- Most scored – 115 in 40 games (2.88 goals/games). (Western League Premier Division, 1960–61)
- Most conceded – 96 in 34 games (2.82 goals/game). (Western League Second Division, 1948–49)
- Least scored – 35 in 40 games (0.88 goals/game). (Southern League South, 1985–86)
- Least conceded – 30 in 34 games (0.88 goals/game). (Southern League Division One South, 1976–77)
