= Wells City F.C. =

Association football club in England

Coordinates: 51°12′09″N 2°39′06″W

Wells City
- Full name: Wells City Football Club
- Founded: 1890
- Ground: The Athletic Ground, Wells
- Capacity: 1,500
- Chairman: Alex Petheram
- Manager: Steve Murray
- League: Western League Premier Division
- 2025–26: Western League Division One, 3rd of 20 (promoted)
Home colours	Away colours

Wells City F.C. are a football club based in Wells, Somerset, England. The club is affiliated to the Somerset County FA. They are currently members of the Western League Premier Division and play at the Athletic Ground.

== History ==
They joined the Western League Division Two in 1929 and won the Western League title in 1950. Declining performances culminated in relegation to the second division after the 1956–57 season and after three seasons in the Western League Division Two, Wells City left the league.

Wells rejoined the Somerset Senior League in 1960–61 with the reserves competing in the Mid-Somerset Football League. Wells finished 6th in their first season back in the Somerset Senior League. The side finished very much in mid-table until 1965–66 when they were third behind Street and Welton Rovers Reserves. They were runners-up behind Paulton Rovers in 1971–72. Relegation from the Premier Division to Division occurred at the end of the 1977–78 season with promotion to the top section being gained at the end of 1979–80. 1981–82 saw another relegation. Promotion back again was a long time in arriving, not until 1994 would Wells City grace the top flight of Somerset football. Soon the yo-yo effect happened once more with relegation at the end of 1997–98 followed by bouncing straight back up in 1998–99. The club maintained a Premier Division place until promotion back to the Western Football League Division One in 2008.

Wells City would finally reclaim the Somerset Senior Cup in 2006–07, defeating Burnham United 2–1 at Weston-super-Mare.

Wells City's first season back in the Western League saw them finish a respectable mid-table finish in 10th place.

On 24 April 2010 Wells City earned promotion to the Premier Division of the Western Football League after finishing 1st. They were however relegated back to Division One in 2013.

== Ground ==
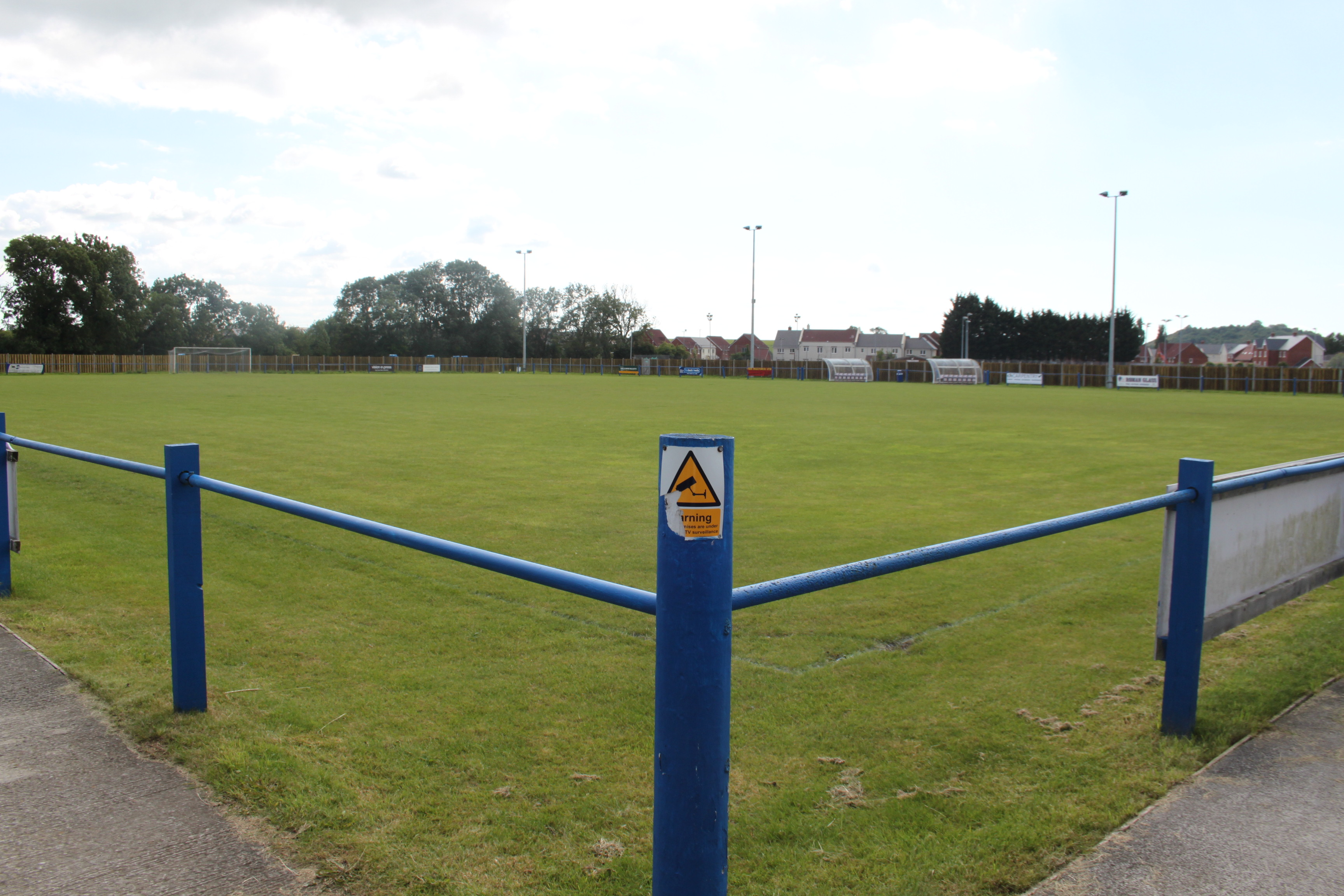
Wells City F.C. ground, Rowdens Rd

Wells City play their home games at the Athletic Ground, Rowdens Road, Wells, BA5 1TU.

== Honours ==
=== League honours ===
- Western League Division One:
  - Winners: 1949–50, 2009–10
  - Runners-up: 1950–51, 2015–16
- Somerset County Football League Premier Division:
  - Runners-up: 2007–08, 2022-23(Reserves)

=== Cup honours ===
- Somerset Premier Cup
  - Winners: 2015–16
- Somerset Senior Cup:
  - Winners: 1896–97, 1930–31, 1931–32 (Joint with Radstock Town F.C.), 1937–38, 2006–07, 2021-22(Reserves), 2023-24(Reserves), 2025-2026(Reserves)
  - Runners-up: 1895–96, 1927–28, 1929–30, 1938–39, 1947–48, 2001–02
- Somerset Junior Cup
  - Winners (1): 1901–02, 2023–24

== Records ==
- FA Cup: 4th Qualifying Round in 1954–55 season
- FA Vase: 3rd Round 2023–24 season, 2024–25 season
