= Peasedown Miners Welfare F.C. =

Association football club in England

Peasedown Miners Welfare
- Full name: Peasedown Miners Welfare Football Club
- Founded: Season 1895/96
- Ground: Miners Welfare Recreation Ground, Peasedown St John
- Manager: Dom Eatherden
- League: Somerset County League Division One
- 2024–25: Somerset County League Division One, 11th of 16
- Website: http://www.clubwebsite.co.uk/peasedownathletic

Peasedown Miners Welfare Football Club is a football club based in Peasedown St John, Somerset, England. Formerly known as Peasedown St John and Peasedown Athletic, the club has played at Western Football League level, and currently plays in the Somerset County League Division One. In their first incarnation as Peasedown Miners Welfare, they featured in the FA Cup during the 1940s and 1950s. The club plays its home games at the Miners Welfare Recreation Ground.

== History ==
As Peasedown St John, the club played at its highest level when it joined the Western League in 1911 and stayed for three seasons, finishing fifth in 1913–14, the last season before World War I disrupted regular football in England. After the war, Peasedown resumed in Division Two of a restructured Western League, winning promotion to Division One in 1920–21. They managed fifth place in Division One again in 1922–23, but left two years later after a poor season in 1924–25.

The club returned to the Western League in 1939–40 as Peasedown Miners Welfare, securing the highest finish in their history in fourth place, but football was again disrupted, this time by World War II. After the resumption of football in 1945–46 they equalled their best finish of fourth place before a run of poor form resulted in relegation to Division Two in 1950–51. They gradually dropped down this division, and left the league in 1960.

During this post-war period, Peasedown competed in the FA Cup, reaching the Fourth Qualifying Round in 1945–46. They missed out on the First Round Proper after losing a replay 1–0 at home to Cheltenham Town. Entering the competition every season until 1956–57, they never again reached further than the Second Qualifying Round.

Dropping into the Bath and District League during the 1960s and 1970s, the club eventually graduated to the Somerset County League as Peasedown Athletic, finishing runners-up in the Premier Division twice in the mid-1990s. Relegated to Division One in 1999, they achieved promotion in 2001 but were again relegated in 2003, and subsequently dropped to Division Two in 2005. For 2012–13, they were members of Division Two East.

In 2016, the club reverted to the name of Peasedown Miners Welfare.

== Ground ==
Peasedown Miners Welfare play their home games at the Miners Welfare Recreation Ground, Church Road, Peasedown St John, Somerset, BA2 8AA.

== Honours ==
=== League ===
Western Football League Division Two

- Winners – 1920–21 (as Peasedown St John)

Somerset County League

- Winners – 1920–21

Bath and District League Division One

- Division One winners – 1902–03
- Division Two winners – 1964–65
- Division Four winners – 1967–68

Mid-Somerset Football League (Reserves)

- Morland Cup Winners – 2012–13
- Division Two winners, Morland Cup Finalists – 2013–14

=== Cup ===
Somerset Senior Cup

- Winners (9) – 1920–21, 1946–47, 1947–48, 1948–49, 1953–54, 1954–55, 1956–57, 1970–71, 1987–88

Somerset Junior Cup

- Winners – 1900–01
