= Chippenham Town F.C. =

Association football club in Chippenham, England

Coordinates: 51°27′56″N 2°7′44″W

Chippenham Town
- Full name: Chippenham Town Football Club
- Nickname: The Bluebirds
- Founded: 1884
- Ground: Hardenhuish Park, Chippenham
- Capacity: 3,000 (300 seated)
- Chairman: Neil Blackmore
- Manager: Gary Horgan
- League: Southern League Premier Division South
- 2025–26: National League South, 22nd of 24 (relegated)
- Website: chippenhamtown.com
Home colours	Away colours

Chippenham Town Football Club is a semi-professional football club based in Chippenham, Wiltshire, England. They are currently members of and play their games at Hardenhuish Park.

== History ==
The club states it was established in 1873, although local newspaper reports state the club was founded on 3 December 1884, with the first game played on 17 December 1884 against Melksham. In 1894 they were founder members of the Wiltshire League. The 1901–02 season saw them finish joint top of the table with Warminster Town, but the club lost the championship play-off replay 1–0, following a 1–1 draw in the first match. They joined Division Two of the Western League in 1904, but also continued to play in the Wiltshire League. The 1904–05 season saw them finish bottom of the Western League and second in the Wiltshire League. At the end of the 1905–06 season the club withdrew from the Western League, and went on to win the Wiltshire League in 1907–08 and 1908–09, before finishing as runners-up in 1909–10. They were runners-up again in 1912–13, 1921–22 and 1922–23, before winning the league in 1928–29.

In 1930 Chippenham rejoined Division Two of the Western League. The league was reduced to a single division in 1939, and the club were runners-up when the league resumed in the 1945–46 season. The 1951–52 season saw them win the Western League for the first time, and they also reached the first round of the FA Cup for the first time, losing 3–0 at Leyton. They were Western League runners-up again in 1954–55. However, they left the Western League at the end of the 1964–65 season, dropping back into the Wiltshire League. In 1968 the club joined the Premier Division of the Hellenic League, where they played until rejoining the Western League in 1973. When the league gained a second division in 1976, the club were relegated to the new Division One. They were Division One champions in 1980–81, earning promotion to the Premier Division. In 1999–2000 the club reached the final of the FA Vase, eventually losing 1–0 to Deal Town at Wembley Stadium.

After finishing as runners-up in 2000–01, Chippenham were promoted to Division One West of the Southern League. Their first season in the division saw them finish as runners-up, resulting in promotion to the Southern League Premier Division. In 2004–05 they were Premier Division runners-up, qualifying for the promotion play-offs. However, after beating Bedford Town 5–4 on penalties following a 2–2 draw in the semi-finals, they lost the final 1–0 to Hednesford Town. The following season saw them reach the first round of the FA Cup for a second time, eventually losing 1–0 at Worcester City in a replay. They also qualified for the promotion play-offs again after finishing fourth, beating King's Lynn 3–1 in the semi-finals before losing 3–2 to Bedford Town in the final. Another fourth-place finish in 2007–08 led to another play-off campaign, this time ending with a 2–1 defeat to Halesowen Town in the semi-finals. In 2009–10 the club finished third, and after beating Hednesford Town 2–0 in the play-off semi-finals, lost the final 2–1 to Nuneaton Town.

In 2016–17 Chippenham won the Southern League's Premier Division with a league record 103 points, earning promotion to the National League South. They reached the first round of the FA Cup again in 2019–20, losing 3–0 at home to Northampton Town. The 2021–22 National League South season saw the club qualify for the promotion play-offs after finishing seventh, going on to beat Dartford 3–2 on penalties (after a 0–0 draw) in the quarter-finals, before losing 1–0 to Ebbsfleet United after extra time in the semi-finals. In 2022–23 the club reached the FA Cup first round again; after beating Lincoln City 1–0, they lost 6–1 at Burton Albion in the second round. They finished third-from-bottom of the National League South in 2025–26 and were relegated to the Premier Division South of the Southern League.

== Ground ==
The club moved to Hardenhuish Park in 1919, having previously played at at least four other grounds. A main stand was erected and subsequently added to on several occasions. A clubhouse was opened in 1979, which has since been turned into hospitality suites, and floodlights were installed in 1986. Additional covered standing is, as of 2021, now provided behind one goal whilst covered standing is along the opposite side of the pitch to the main stand. This was built in 1993, replacing an earlier stand that had been damaged by storms. The pitch at Hardenhuish Park has a noticeable slope, downwards towards the Town End. A new, bigger clubhouse at pitch level was opened in 2020, housing a bar and is a year-round community facility. The ground currently has a capacity of 3,000, of which 300 is seated.

== Current squad ==
As of 11 August 2026

Note: Flags indicate national team as defined under FIFA eligibility rules; some limited exceptions apply. Players may hold more than one non-FIFA nationality.

Pos.	Nation	Player
GK	ENG	Harvey Rees
DF	ENG	Freddie Grant
DF	ENG	Ben Richards-Everton
DF	ENG	Luke Haines (captain)
DF	POR	Nelson Sanca
DF	WAL	Jac Poffley
DF	ENG	Piotr Petrynski
DF	IRL	Kevin Williams
DF	WAL	Alex Kieh
DF	ENG	Harry Messenger
MF	ENG	Will King
MF	ENG	Lewis Royston

Pos.	Nation	Player
MF	ENG	Henry Sady
MF	ENG	Harry Hogg (on loan from Bristol City)
MF	ENG	Josh Marcon
MF	ENG	Leon Moore
MF	ENG	Felix Miles
MF	ENG	Marley Rose
FW	POL	Olaf Koszela
FW	ENG	Ethan Lindo
FW	ENG	Ollie Bray
FW	ENG	Ed Oatley
FW	ENG	Joel Odei-Larbi

== Honours ==
- Southern League
  - Premier Division champions 2016–17
- Western League
  - Premier Division champions 1951–52
  - Division One champions 1980–81
  - League Cup winners 1999–2000, 2000–01
- Wiltshire League
  - Champions 1907–08, 1908–09, 1928–29
- Wiltshire Premier Shield
  - Winners 1965–66, 1986–87, 1988–89, 2001–02, 2003–04, 2004–05, 2005–06, 2010–11, 2017–18, 2023–24

== Records ==
- Best FA Cup performance: Second round, 2022–23
- Best FA Trophy performance: Third round, 2022–23
- Best FA Vase performance: Finalists, 1999–2000
- Record attendance: 4,800 vs Chippenham United, Western League, 1951
- Biggest win: 9–0 vs Devizes Town, FA Cup, 1945–46; 9–0 vs Dawlish Town, Western League; 9–0 vs Moneyfields, FA Cup, 2015–16
- Heaviest defeat: 10–0 vs Tiverton Town, Western League
- Most appearances: Ian Monnery
- Most goals: Dave Ferris

== See also ==
- Chippenham Town F.C. players
- Chippenham Town F.C. managers
