= Clandown F.C. =

English non-league football club

- Full name: Clandown Football Club
- Founded: 1920
- Dissolved: 2004
- Ground: Greyfield Sports and Social Club
- League: Somerset County League

Clandown F.C. was a non-league football club that played in the village of Clandown, near Radstock in Somerset. Clandown played in the Western Football League, Wiltshire Premier League and the Somerset Senior League until 2003–04. They played for most of their existence at Thynne Field, which is now in poor condition as the clubhouse was blown down by a severe storm in the early 1990s. In 1999 the club moved to Greyfield Sports and Social Club in nearby Paulton.

Clandown joined Division 2 of the Western League in 1920–21, but although they won the division the following season, they left the league.

They rejoined immediately after the Second World War and remained in the league until 1959–60. They were Division 2 champions in 1946–47 and were promoted to Division 1, but little success followed. They were relegated in 1954 and remained in Division 2 until 1959–60, when they joined the Wiltshire Premier League.

Clandown rejoined the Western League in 1976–77 and won promotion to the Premier Division the following season. Their best seasons were 1981–82 and 1982–83, with fourth-place finishes. However, in 1987–88 they finished bottom and were relegated to Division 1, where they remained for a further four seasons before resigning in 1992 and replacing their reserve team in the Somerset Senior League. After 12 seasons with little success, the club folded. The club was affiliated to the Somerset County FA.

== Sources ==
- Miller, Kerry: The History of Non-League Football Grounds (1996)
- Webb, Doug & Sandie: A View From The Terraces: One Hundred Years of the Western Football League 1892–1992 (1992)
