= List of Bristol Rovers F.C. players =

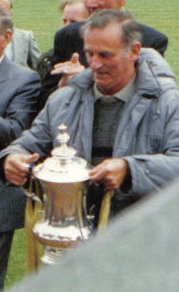
Bristol Rovers record scorer, Geoff Bradford, who scored 355 goals for the club, 242 of which were in the Football League.

The following article is a list of footballers past and present who have played for Bristol Rovers Football Club.

In the club's early history the appearance record was held by goalkeeper Arthur Cartlidge, who played in 258 Southern League games between 1901 and 1909. His record stood until it was broken by another goalkeeper, Jesse Whatley, who played 14 times in the Southern League and a further 372 in The Football League, making a total of 386 overall. Following the Second World War the Bristol Rovers board introduced a no-buy/no-sell policy, which remained in force until the abolition of the maximum wage in football in 1961; as a result some players in that era had a high number of appearances for the club. Eight of the top nine most-used players played during this time, each making over 400 appearances. These eight were Bobby Jones (421 appearances), Alfie Biggs (424), Ray Warren (450), Harold Jarman (452), George Petherbridge (457), Geoff Bradford (462), Jack Pitt (466), and Harry Bamford (486). The club's all-time leading appearance maker, Stuart Taylor, played in 546 League games between 1965 and 1980. The club's highest scorer by a wide margin is Geoff Bradford, who scored 242 times in The Football League, exceeding the next-highest scorer Alfie Biggs by 64 goals.

== Players ==
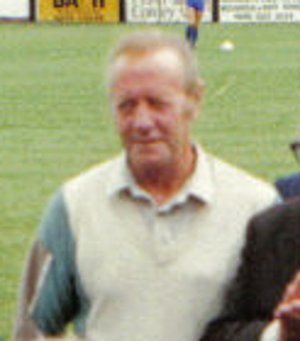
Forward Alfie Biggs made 424 appearances for Rovers in two spells between 1953 and 1961 and again between 1962 and 1968. With 178 goals, he is the club's second highest goalscorer.

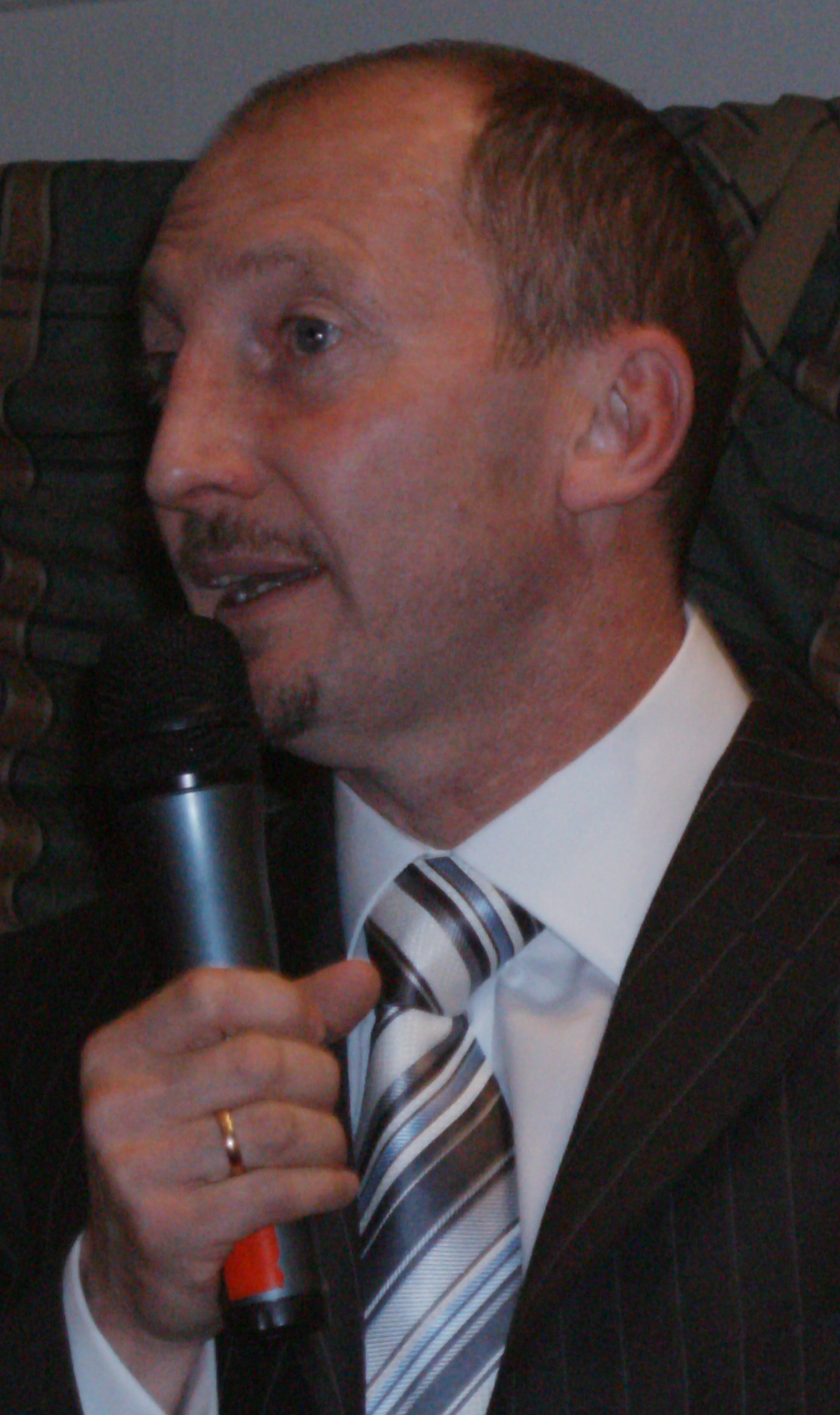
Ian Holloway, who played 397 league games in three spells with the club.

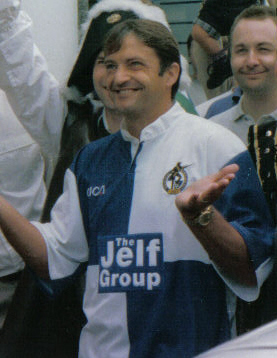
England international Gary Mabbutt, who played 131 league games between 1977 and 1982.

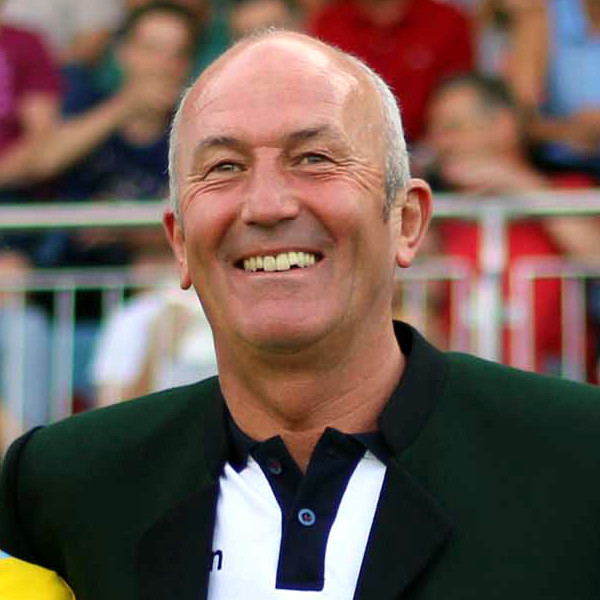
Tony Pulis made 130 Rovers appearances in two spells from 1975 to 1981 and 1982 to 1984.

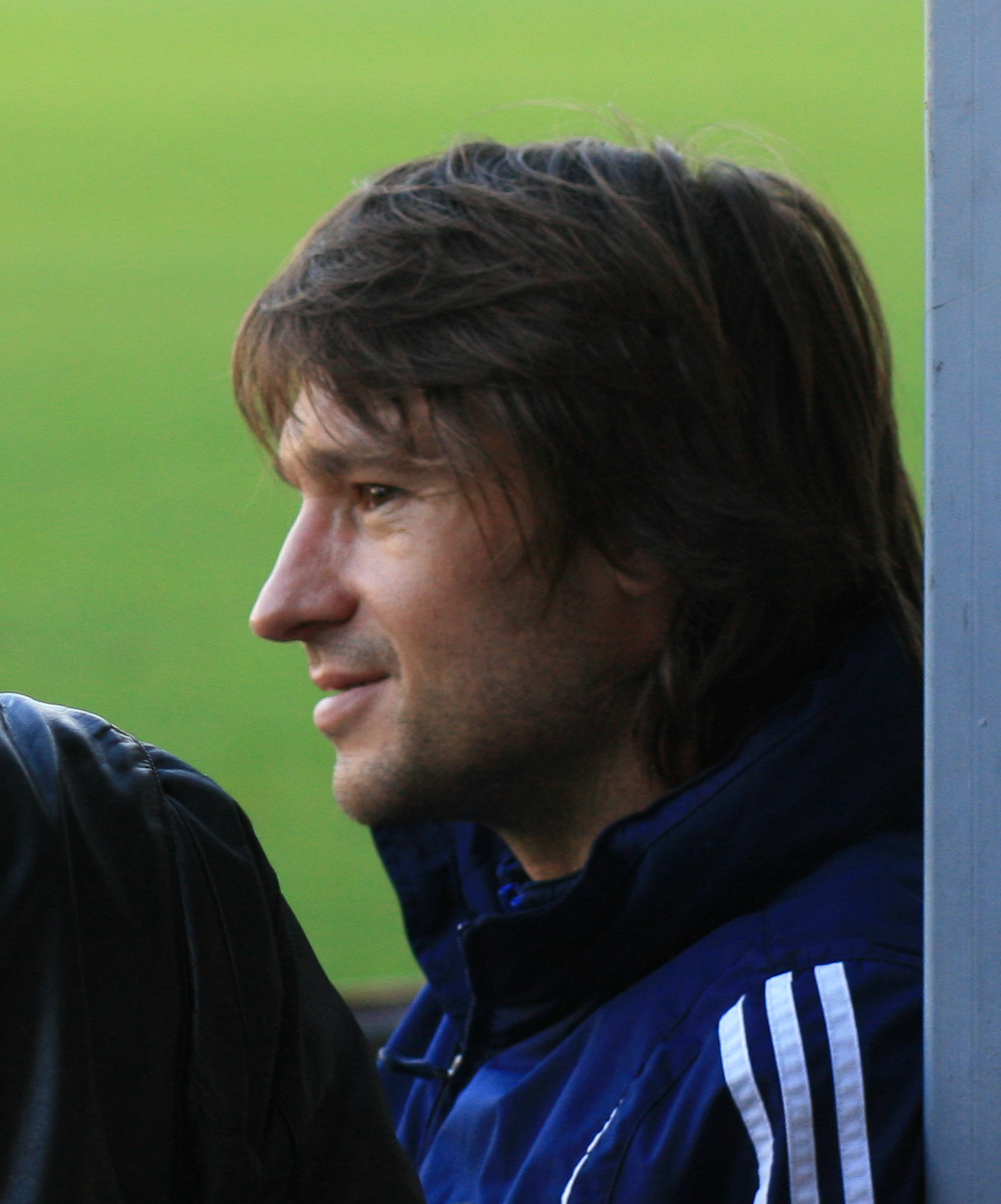
Rovers' most capped player Vitālijs Astafjevs, who played 167 times for Latvia.

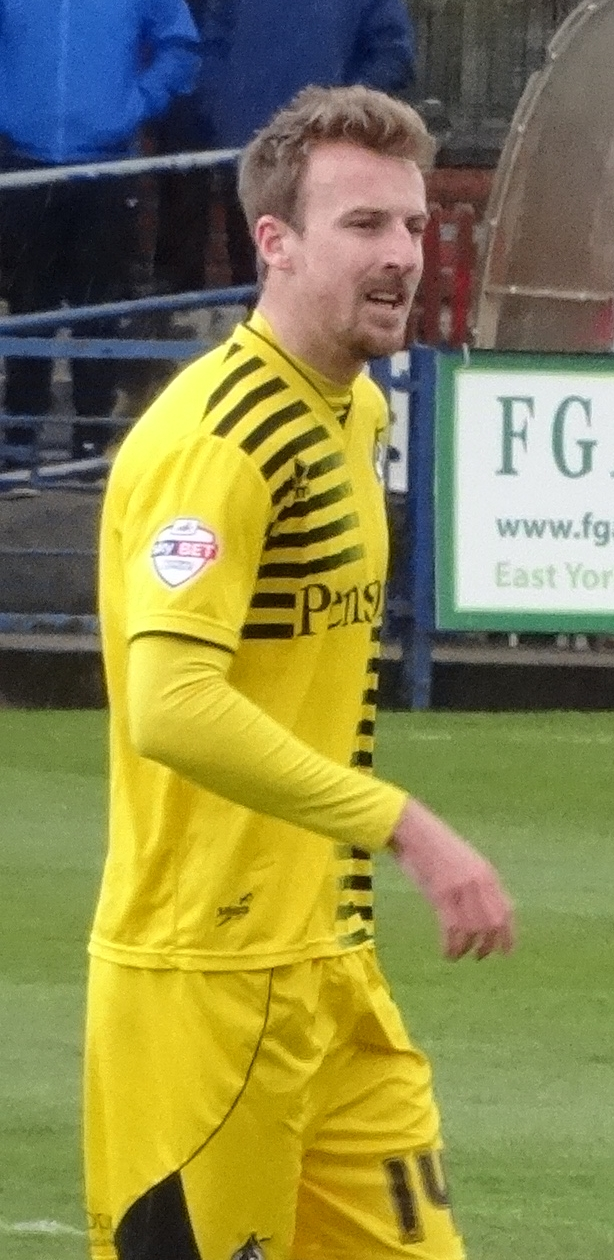
Chris Lines made 314 appearances for Rovers in three spells between 2004 and 2019. He achieved three promotions at the club and is the highest appearance maker of the 21st century.

The list of players below includes all team members who have played in at least 100 professional league games for Bristol Rovers, which includes games played in the Southern League (1899–1920), Football League (1920–2014 and 2015–) and Football Conference (2014–15), and also includes substitute appearances.

Statistics are correct as of match played 21 November 2026

Position key: GK – Goalkeeper; DF – Defender; MF – Midfielder; FW – Forward

† Current Bristol Rovers player, as at 30 June 2026
‡ Capped at full international level^{[a]}

Table of players, including nationality, playing position and club statistics
Player	Nationality^{[b]}	Pos^{[c]}	Club career	Apps^{[d]}	Goals^{[e]}	Ref^{[f]}
Junior Agogo	Ghana ‡	FW	2003–2006	126	41	
Peter Aitken	Wales	MF	1972–1980	234	3	
Ian Alexander	Scotland	DF	1986–1994	291	6	
Byron Anthony	Wales	DF	2006–2012	163	7	
Ben Appleby	England	MF	1903–1908	180	9	
Lee Archer	England	MF	1991–1997	126	13	
Harry Armitage	England	DF	1922–1926	122	0	
Vitālijs Astafjevs	Latvia ‡	MF	2000–2003	110	16	
Harry Bamford	England	DF	1946–1958	486	5	
Bruce Bannister	England	FW	1971–1977	206	80	
Mike Barrett	England	MF	1979–1984	128	18	
Phil Bater	Wales	DF	1974–1981; 1983–1986	310	3	
Peter Beadle	England	FW	1995–1998	109	39	
Bert Bennett	England	DF	1911–1915	101	0	
Fred Bennett	England	DF	1925–1930	129	2	
Alfie Biggs	England	FW	1953–1961; 1962–1968	424	178	
Geoff Bradford	England ‡	FW	1949–1964	462	242	
James Brogan	Scotland	FW	1910–1915	106	24	
John Brown	England	FW	1963–1968	156	32	
Lee Brown	England	DF	2011–2018	285	21	
Marcus Browning	Wales ‡	MF	1989–1997	174	11	
Bryan Bush	England	MF/FW	1947–1955	113	19	
Stuart Campbell	Scotland	MF	2004–2011	291	3	
Chris Carruthers	England	DF	2005 (loan); 2005–2008	100	1	
Arthur Cartlidge	England	GK	1901–1909	258	0	
Trevor Challis	England	DF	1998–2003	146	1	
Justin Channing	England	MF	1992–1996	130	10	
Billy Clark	Scotland	FW	1904–1908	133	35	
Billy Clark	England	DF	1987–1997	248	12	
James Clarke	England	DF	2015–2019	112	2	
Ollie Clarke	England	MF	2011–2020	235	20	
Danny Coles	England	DF	2007–2011	102	3	
Andy Collett	England	GK	1994–1999	107	0	
Aaron Collins	Wales ‡	FW	2021–2024	117	35	
Fred Corbett	England	FW	1901–1903; 1904–1905; 1908–1911	139	52	
Ellis Crompton	England	FW	1913–1921	150	36	
Jamie Cureton	England	FW	1996–2000	174	72	
Joe Davis	England	DF	1960–1967	211	4	
Graham Day	England	DF	1973–1979	130	1	
Craig Disley	England	MF	2004–2009	203	25	
Ronnie Dix	England ‡	FW	1928–1932	100	33	
Alec Donald	Scotland	DF	1932–1936	136	0	
Hughie Dunn	Scotland	DF	1901–1906	155	1	
Jim Eadie	Scotland	GK	1973–1977	183	0	
Nathan Ellington	England	FW	1999–2002	116	35	
Steve Elliott	England	DF	2004–2010	218	17	
Antony Evans	England	MF	2021–2024	121	21	
Gordon Fearnley	England	FW	1970–1977	120	21	
Sam Finley	England	MF	2021–2024	104	5	
Steve Foster	England	DF	1997–2002	197	7	
Geoff Fox	England	DF	1947–1955	276	2	
Rory Gaffney	Republic of Ireland	FW	2015–2016 (loan); 2016–2018	100	21	
Ray Graydon	England	MF	1965–1971	133	33	
Arthur Griffiths	England	DF	1897–1904	105	1	
Andy Gurney	England	DF	1992–1997	108	9	
Lewis Haldane	Wales	MF/FW	2002–2010	147	15	
Denzil Hale	England	MF/FW	1952–1959	120	12	
Bernard Hall	England	GK	1959–1967	163	0	
Ian Hamilton	England	FW	1958–1968	149	60	
Ellis Harrison †	Wales	FW	2011–2018; 2025–	235	58	
David Harvie	Scotland	DF	1910–1920	219	1	
Jimmy Haydon	England	DF	1921–1931	290	5	
Doug Hillard	England	DF	1957–1968	318	12	
Craig Hinton	England	DF	2004–2009	153	3	
Len Hodges	England	FW	1946–1950	118	20	
Ian Holloway	England	MF	1981–1985; 1987–1991; 1996–1999	397	42	
Peter Hooper	Kenya ‡	FW	1953–1962	297	101	
Bert Hoyle	England	GK	1950–1953	104	0	
Jeff Hughes	Northern Ireland ‡	MF	2008–2011	129	28	
Harold Jarman	England	MF	1959–1973	452	127	
Bobby Jones	England	FW	1956–1966; 1967–1973	421	101	
Glyn Jones	Wales	DF	1962–1966	153	0	
Vaughan Jones	Wales	DF	1976–1982; 1984 (loan); 1985–1993	381	12	
Wayne Jones	Wales ‡	MF	1966–1972	224	28	
Alfie Kilgour †	England	DF	2019–2023; 2025–	134	5	
Jo Kuffour	Ghana	FW	2008–2012	130	32	
Vic Lambden	England	FW	1945–1955	268	117	
Rickie Lambert	England ‡	FW	2006–2009	128	51	
Daniel Leadbitter	England	DF	2014–2019	115	1	
Aaron Lescott	England	DF	2004 (loan); 2004–2010	207	5	
Chris Lines	England	MF	2004–2011; 2015 (loan); 2015–2019	314	30	
Tom Lockyer	Wales ‡	DF	2012–2019; 2025–2026	271	6	
James Lofthouse	England	FW	1923–1926	105	15	
Gary Mabbutt	England ‡	DF	1977–1982	131	10	
Ray Mabbutt	England	MF	1956–1969	395	27	
Nigel Martyn	England ‡	GK	1987–1989	101	0	
Wally McArthur	England	MF	1933–1950	261	14	
Aidan McCaffrey	England	DF	1980–1985	184	11	
Mark McChrystal	Northern Ireland	DF	2013–2017	114	0	
Jock McLean	Scotland	MF	1933–1938	134	1	
George McNestry	England	FW	1932–1935	113	42	
David Mehew	England	MF	1985–1994	222	63	
Barrie Meyer	England	FW	1953–1958	139	60	
Steve Mildenhall	England	GK	2013 (loan); 2013–2017	127	0	
Paul Miller	England	FW	1994–1997	127	29	
Jerry Morgan	England	FW	1920–1925	114	25	
Jimmy Morgan	England	FW	1946–1952	104	24	
Alex Munro	Scotland	DF/MF/FW	1962–1971	169	11	
Joe Nicholls	England	GK	1936–1939	112	0	
Matt O'Mahoney	Ireland ‡^{[g]}	DF	1936–1939	101	6	
Terry Oldfield	England	MF/FW	1958–1966	132	11	
Billy Palmer	England	FW	1912–1913; 1919–1922	102	14	
Tom Parkes	England	DF	2012 (loan); 2012–2016	175	7	
Brian Parkin	England	GK	1989–1996; 1999–2000	246	0	
Tim Parkin	England	DF	1981–1986	206	12	
Lindsay Parsons	England	DF	1963–1977	360	0	
Gary Penrice	England	MF/FW	1983–1989; 1997–2002	257	60	
Billy Peplow	England	FW	1908–1915	216	42	
George Petherbridge	England	FW	1945–1962	457	85	
Steve Phillips	England	GK	2006–2010	136	0	
Bill Pickering	England	DF	1931–1937	215	1	
Jack Pitt	England	MF	1946–1960	466	16	
Tony Pounder	England	MF	1990–1994	113	10	
Frankie Prince	Wales	MF	1967–1980	362	22	
David Pritchard	England	DF	1994–2001	163	1	
Dick Pudan	England	DF	1902–1907	116	0	
Tony Pulis	Wales	DF/MF	1975–1981; 1982–1984	130	5	
Phil Purnell	England	MF	1985–1992	153	22	
David Pyle	England	DF	1955–1962	139	0	
Howard Radford	Wales	GK	1951–1962	245	0	
Paul Randall	England	FW	1977–1978; 1981–1986	277	107	wiki
Andy Reece	England	MF	1987–1993	239	17	
Eliot Richards	Wales	MF/FW	2009–2014	120	15	
Phil Roberts	Wales ‡	DF/MF	1968–1973	175	6	
Thomas Roberts	England	MF/FW	1925–1930	120	6	
Peter Roney	Scotland	GK	1909–1915	178	1	
Bill Roost	England	FW	1948–1957	178	49	
Peter Sampson	England	MF	1948–1961	340	4	
Carl Saunders	England	FW	1990–1993	142	42	
Liam Sercombe	England	MF	2017–2020	103	13	
Bill Shaw	Scotland	MF	1909–1912	103	6	
Dick Sheppard	England	GK	1969–1975	151	0	
Stephen Sims	England	DF	1919–1922; 1926–1927	111	18	
Scott Sinclair	England	MF	2005; 2022–2025	100	12	
Stuart Sinclair	England	MF	2014–2019	142	7	
Justin Skinner	England	MF	1991–1998	187	11	
Neil Slatter	Wales ‡	DF	1980–1985	148	4	
Jack Smart	England	MF	1905–1910	105	3	
Michael Smith	Northern Ireland ‡	DF	2011–2014	101	1	
David Staniforth	England	FW	1974–1979	153	32	
Tom Stanton	Scotland	DF/MF	1968–1976	172	7	
Archie Stephens	England	FW	1981–1985	127	40	
Kenny Stephens	England	MF	1970–1977	223	11	
Worrell Sterling	England	MF	1993–1996	119	6	
Marcus Stewart	England	FW	1991–1996	171	57	
David Stone	England	DF	1960–1968	148	6	
Norman Sykes	England	MF	1952–1964	214	5	
Nick Tanner	England	DF	1985–1988	107	3	
Connor Taylor	England	DF	2021–22 (loan); 2023–2025	117	4	
Matty Taylor	England	FW	2014–2017	118	61	
Stuart Taylor	England	DF	1965–1980	546	28	
Luke Thomas	England	MF	2021–2022 (loan); 2023–2026	132	9	
Martin Thomas	Wales ‡	GK	1977–1983	162	0	
Andy Thomson	England	DF	1999–2002	127	6	
Andy Tillson	England	DF	1992–2000	253	11	
Geoff Twentyman	England	DF	1986–1993	252	6	
Bobbie Walker	England	MF	1912–1915	107	12	
Richard Walker	England	FW	2004–2009	143	46	
Joe Walter	England	MF	1919–1922; 1928–1929	124	9	
Alan Warboys	England	FW	1973–1977	144	53	
Dai Ward	Wales ‡	FW	1954–1961	175	90	
Ray Warren	England	MF	1936–1956	450	28	
Barry Watkins	Wales	DF/FW	1945–1957	115	7	
Josser Watling	England	DF/FW	1947–1963	323	19	
Arthur Weare	Wales	GK	1945–1951	141	0	
Jesse Whatley	England	GK	1919–1930	386	0	
Ernie Whatmore	England	FW	1923–1928	134	40	
Devon White	England	FW	1987–1992	202	52	
Steve White	England	FW	1977–1979; 1983–1986	150	44	
Brian Williams	England	DF	1981–1985	163	20	
David Williams	Wales ‡	MF	1975–1985	352	66	
Geraint Williams	Wales ‡	MF	1980–1985	141	8	
Louis Williams	England	MF	1909–1912	106	1	
Steve Yates	England	DF	1986–1993	197	0	

== Footnotes ==
- ^{a} Unless otherwise stated, all international caps are taken from Byrne & Jay (2003).
- ^{b} A player's nationality is defined as the country they have represented at the international level if they have done so; otherwise it is their country of birth.
- ^{c} Playing positions are taken from Byrne & Jay (2003) unless otherwise stated.
- ^{d} Number of league appearances for Bristol Rovers
- ^{e} Number of league goals scored for Bristol Rovers
- ^{f} Unless otherwise stated, player statistics are taken from Byrne & Jay (2003).
- ^{g} Matt O'Mahoney was a dual Irish international, having played for both the FAI and IFA national teams.

== See also ==
- List of Bristol Rovers F.C. international players
- List of Bristol Rovers F.C. players (25–99 appearances)
- Category:Bristol Rovers F.C. players
- Bristol Rovers F.C.#Current squad

== Bibliography ==
- Byrne, Stephen; Jay, Mike (2003). Bristol Rovers Football Club: The Definitive History 1883–2003. Stroud: Tempus Publishing. ISBN 978-0-7524-2717-1.
- Giles, Edward (2007). Bristol Rovers, The Bert Tann Era: A Personal Memoir. Southend-on-Sea: Desert Island Books. ISBN 978-1-905328-37-6.
- Jay, Mike; Byrne, Stephen (1994). Pirates in Profile: A Who's Who of Bristol Rovers Players. Bristol: Potten, Baber & Murray. ISBN 978-0-9524835-0-2.
- Rollin, Glenda; Rollin, Jack, eds. (2007). Sky Sports Football Yearbook 2007–2008. London: Headline Publishing Group. ISBN 978-0-7553-1664-9.
- Rollin, Glenda; Rollin, Jack, eds. (2009). Sky Sports Football Yearbook 2009–2010. London: Headline Publishing Group. ISBN 978-0-7553-1948-0.
