= List of Bristol Rovers F.C. managers =

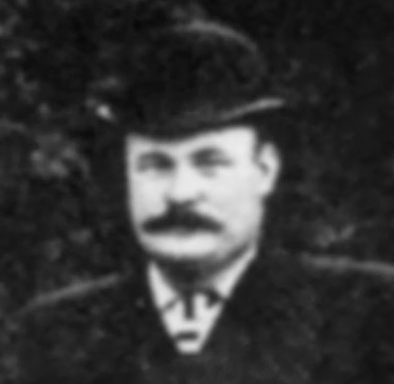
Bristol Rovers first full-time manager, Alfred Homer.

This is a list of Bristol Rovers F.C. managers since the club appointed its first full-time manager in 1899, along with the number of competitive games managed, winning percentage and titles won.

Although the club were founded in 1883, they did not appoint a full-time manager until 1899, when Alfred Homer, who was assistant secretary of Aston Villa, was appointed as manager-secretary of Bristol Rovers, a position he held for twenty-one years. On joining the Football League in 1920, the club appointed Ben Hall to the manager's post. Hall held the job for one year before handing over to Andrew Wilson, the club's first non-English manager.

The next significant manager of Bristol Rovers was Albert Prince-Cox, who introduced blue-and-white quarters as the team's kit because he believed it made the players look larger and more intimidating. He also became the first manager to win a major cup competition with the club when they won the Division 3 (South) Cup in 1935. More success followed in the 1952–53 season when Bristol Rovers' longest serving post-war manager, Bert Tann, won a league title for the first time since 1905 and won promotion for the first time ever when the club won Division 3 (South). Tann remained in charge for eighteen years from 1950 to 1968.

Don Megson was the next manager to win a major trophy, taking the Watney Cup in 1972 in only his third game in charge. Following this, only two more managers won any silverware at a national level. These were Gerry Francis, who won the Division 3 title in 1989–90, and most recently Paul Trollope, who won the League 2 play-off final in 2007. That was until the appointment of Darrell Clarke who guided Bristol Rovers to back-to-back promotions, the first in the club's history making him the most successful Bristol Rovers manager ever.

In all the club has had 37 full-time managers (excluding caretaker managers).

== Managers ==
- All statistics are from Bristol Rovers Football Club – The Definitive History 1883–2003 unless otherwise stated.
- Information correct as of match played 2 May 2025

Name	Nationality	Bristol Rovers career	Games	Won	Drawn	Lost	% won (Note: Win percentage is rounded to one decimal place)	Honours	Notes
Alfred Homer	England	Summer 1899 – July 1920	652	243	148	261	37.3	Southern League champions, 3 Gloucestershire Cups	
Ben Hall	England	July 1920 – May 1921	45	19	7	19	42.2	-	
Andrew Wilson	Scotland	June 1921 – April 1926	230	74	64	92	32.2	Gloucestershire Cup winner	
Joe Palmer	England	May 1926 – April 1929	138	48	22	68	34.8	Gloucestershire Cup winner	
David McLean	Scotland	May 1929 – September 1930	58	16	12	30	27.6	-	
Albert Prince-Cox	England	October 1930 – October 1936	295	115	67	113	39.0	Division 3 South Cup winner, 2 Gloucestershire Cups	
Percy Smith	England	November 1936 – November 1937	52	17	9	26	32.7	-	
Brough Fletcher	England	January 1938 – January 1950	227	80	49	98	35.2	3 Gloucestershire Cups	
Bert Tann	England	January 1950 – April 1968	897	369	216	314	41.1	Division 3 South champions, Gloucestershire Cups: won 5, shared 5	
Fred Ford	England	April 1968 – July 1969	70	26	16	28	37.1	-	
Bill Dodgin Sr.	England	August 1969 – July 1972	163	72	47	44	44.2	-	
Don Megson	England	July 1972 – November 1977	269	91	85	93	33.8	Watney Cup winner, 2 Gloucestershire Cups, promotion to Division 2	
Bobby Campbell	Scotland	November 1977 – December 1979	91	32	19	40	35.2	-	
Harold Jarman	England	December 1979 – April 1980	24	7	9	8	29.2	-	
Terry Cooper	England	April 1980 – October 1981	68	13	19	36	19.1	-	
Ron Gingell (caretaker)	England	October 1981	1	0	1	0	0.0	-	
Bobby Gould	England	October 1981 – May 1983; May 1985 – June 1987	196	71	42	83	36.2	Gloucestershire Cup winner	
David Williams	Wales	May 1983 – May 1985	108	51	28	29	47.2	2 Gloucestershire Cups	
Gerry Francis	England	July 1987 – May 1991; July 2001 – December 2001	240	95	72	73	39.6	Division 3 champions, 2 Gloucestershire Cups	
Martin Dobson	England	July 1991 – October 1991	12	1	2	9	8.3	-	
Dennis Rofe	England	October 1991 – November 1992	63	21	18	24	33.3	Gloucestershire Cup winner	
Malcolm Allison	England	November 1992 – February 1993	18	6	4	8	33.3	-	
Steve Cross (caretaker)	England	March 1993	3	0	1	2	0.0	-	
John Ward	England	March 1993 – May 1996; December 2012 – March 2014	250	101	70	79	40.4	2 Gloucestershire Cups	
Ian Holloway	England	June 1996 – January 2001	249	92	67	90	36.9	-	
Garry Thompson	England	January 2001 – May 2001 (Note: Garry Thompson was caretaker manager for his first spell in charge); December 2001 – April 2002	47	14	10	23	29.8	-	
Phil Bater (caretaker)	Wales	April 2002; January 2004 – March 2004	14	1	6	7	7.1	-	
Ray Graydon	England	April 2002 – January 2004	81	22	22	37	27.2	-	
Russell Osman; Kevan Broadhurst (joint caretakers) (Note: Russell Osman and Kevan Broadhurst were appointed joint caretaker managers at the end of the 2003–04 season)	England	March 2004 – April 2004	6	3	2	1	50.0	-	
Ian Atkins	England	April 2004 – September 2005	68	21	26	21	30.9	-	
Paul Trollope	Wales	September 2005 – December 2010	284	106	71	107	37.3	League 2 play-off winner	
Darren Patterson (caretaker)	Northern Ireland	December 2010 – January 2011	2	0	0	2	0.0		
Dave Penney	England	January 2011 – March 2011	13	2	2	9	15.4		
Stuart Campbell (caretaker)	Scotland	March 2011 – May 2011	12	4	3	5	33.3		
Paul Buckle	England	May 2011 – January 2012	29	8	6	15	27.5		
Mark McGhee	Scotland	January 2012 – December 2012	45	12	12	21	26.6		
Darrell Clarke	England	March 2014 – December 2018; May 2025 – December 2025	270	112	60	101	41.5	Conference Premier play-off winner, promotion to League One	
Graham Coughlan	Republic of Ireland	December 2018 – December 2019	56	25	18	13	44.6		
Joe Dunne (caretaker)	Republic of Ireland	December 2019	1	1	0	0	100		
Kevin Maher (caretaker)	Republic of Ireland	December 2019; January 2020 (Note: Kevin Maher was caretaker manager for one game before the appointment of Ben Garner, then again when Garner was granted compassionate leave)	1	0	1	0	0.0		
Ben Garner	England	December 2019 – November 2020 (Note: Ben Garner was away on compassionate leave from 12 to 22 January 2020 due to a family illness.)	33	6	10	17	18.2		
Tommy Widdrington (caretaker)	England	November 2020; February 2021	3	2	0	1	66.6		
Paul Tisdale	England	November 2020 – February 2021	19	5	3	11	26.3		
Joey Barton	England	February 2021 – October 2023	143	53	30	60	37.1	Promotion to League One	
Andy Mangan (caretaker)	England	October 2023 – November 2023	7	4	2	1	57.1		
Matt Taylor	England	December 2023 – December 2024	57	19	7	31	33.3		
David Horseman (caretaker)	England	December 2024	2	0	1	1	0.0		
Iñigo Calderón	Spain	December 2024 – May 2025	26	6	3	17	23.1		
Steve Evans	Scotland	December 2025 – Present	27	14	3	10	51.9		

== Records ==
=== Most games managed ===
As of 2 May 2026

	Manager	Games	Years
1	(England) Bert Tann	897	1950-1968
2	(England) Alfred Homer	652	1899-1920
3	(England) Albert Prince-Cox	295	1930-1936
4	(Wales) Paul Trollope	284	2005-2010
5	(England) Darrell Clarke	273	2014-2018, 2025
6	(England) Don Megson	269	1972-1977
7	(England) John Ward	250	1993-1996, 2012–2014
8	(England) Ian Holloway	249	1996-2001
9	(England) Gerry Francis	240	1987-1991, 2001
10	(Scotland) Andrew Wilson	230	1921-1926
11	(England) Brough Fletcher	227	1938-1950
12	(England) Bobby Gould	196	1981-1983, 1985–1987
13	(England) Bill Dodgin Sr.	163	1969-1972
14	(England) Joey Barton	143	2021-2023
15	(England) Joe Palmer	138	1926-1929
16	(Wales) David Williams	108	1983-1985

=== Most Wins ===
As of 2 May 2026

		Wins	Games	Years
1	(England) Bert Tann	369	897	1950-1968
2	(England) Alfred Homer	243	652	1899-1920
3	(England) Albert Prince-Cox	115	295	1930-1936
4	(England) Darrell Clarke	112	273	2014-2018, 2025
5	(Wales) Paul Trollope	106	284	2005-2010
6	(England) John Ward	101	250	1993-1996, 2012–2014

=== Highest win percentages ===
As of 2 May 2026 ^{note}

	Manager	Win%	Games	Years
1	(Scotland) Steve Evans	51.9	27	2025-
2	(Wales) David Williams	47.2	108	1983-1985
3	(Republic of Ireland) Graham Coughlan	44.6	56	2018-2019
4	(England) Bill Dodgin Sr.	44.2	163	1969-1972
5	(England) Ben Hall	42.2	45	1920-1921

^Minimum 25 games managed

=== Promotions ===
As of 2 May 2026

	Manager	Promotions	Years
1	(England) Darrell Clarke	2	2015, 2016
2	(England) Bert Tann	1	1953
2	(England) Don Megson	1	1974
2	(England) Gerry Francis	1	1990
2	(Wales) Paul Trollope	1	2007
2	(England) Joey Barton	1	2022

=== Nationalities ===
As of 2 May 2026

	Country	Managers
1	England	29
2	Scotland	5
3	Wales	2
4	Republic of Ireland	1
4	Spain	1

== Bibliography ==
- Byrne, Stephen; Jay, Mike (2003). Bristol Rovers Football Club – The Definitive History 1883–2003. Stroud: Tempus. ISBN 0-7524-2717-2.
- "Bristol Rovers manager history". Soccerbase. Archived from the original on 13 June 2007.
