= George Petherbridge =

English footballer (1927–2013)

Coordinates: 51°28′55″N 2°34′37″W

Personal information
- Full name: George Ernest Petherbridge
- Date of birth: 19 May 1927
- Place of birth: Devonport, England
- Date of death: 4 March 2013 (aged 85)
- Position: Winger

Senior career*
Years	Team	Apps	(Gls)
1945–1962	Bristol Rovers	457	(85)
1962–1963	Salisbury	?	(5)
1963–1964	Falmouth Town	20	(9)
1964–1965	Maidenhead United	2	(1)
- * Club domestic league appearances and goals

George Ernest Petherbridge (19 May 1927 – 4 March 2013) was a professional footballer, who played for Bristol Rovers for seventeen years, between 1945 and 1962.

== Early life ==
Petherbridge was born in Devonport, Devon in 1927 and was the only child of parents Frederick Petherbridge and Violet Trout. The family relocated to Bristol when George was young, and he was brought up in the city.

== Football career ==
Petherbridge joined Bristol Rovers in 1945, and spent his entire professional career with the club, eventually leaving seventeen years later in 1962. He played as a winger and made 457 appearances in the Football League, and 496 in all competitions, scoring 85 league and seven cup goals.

Joining the club in time for the resumption of League football after play had been suspended during World War II, Petherbridge achieved the impressive feat of scoring at least one goal in each of the sixteen seasons immediately after the war. He is one of only three men to have played for Rovers for more than fifteen years, and is the fifth most capped player for the club, behind Stuart Taylor, Harry Bamford, Jack Pitt, and Geoff Bradford. His 85 goals in the Football League make him The Pirates' 9th-highest goalscorer.

After ending his professional career with Rovers, he dropped out of the Football League to join Salisbury in 1962 and in 1963 had a short spell with Cornish side Falmouth Town in the South Western League.

On 9 April 2021, Petherbridge became the seventh player to be inducted into the Bristol Rovers Hall of Fame.

== Family life ==
Petherbridge Way shown within Bristol

Petherbridge married Rita Walker in 1950, and the couple had three children and eleven grandchildren.

Following his retirement from football he worked as a publican, running The Angel in Sherston, and later The Tamar in Cornwall. He also worked as a PE teacher and groundsman at Millfield School and Wells Cathedral School respectively.

Petherbridge Way in Bristol is named after Petherbridge. The road lies midway between Bristol Rovers' former home at Eastville Stadium and their current ground, the Memorial Stadium.

He died on 4 March 2013, at the age of 85.
