= List of Bristol Rovers F.C. international players =

This is a list of all full international footballers to play for Bristol Rovers F.C. Players who were capped while a Bristol Rovers player are marked in bold.

As of 21 November 2026

Player	Nation	Caps	International years	Rovers years
Daniel Allsopp	Australia	3	2007–2009	2000
Louie Soares	Barbados	2	2007	2005
Reggie Lambe	Bermuda	65	2007–	2011
**Ian McLean**	**Canada**	**2**	**1995**	**1993–1996**
**Brandon Aguilera**	**Costa Rica**	**30**	**2022–**	**2024**
Jefferson Louis	Dominica	1	2008	2005
Jean-Paul Kalala	DR Congo	7	2002–2006	2011
Ruel Sotiriou	Cyprus	1	2024–	2024–2026
Hugh Adcock	England	5	1929–1930	1935–1936
Elliot Anderson	England	23	2025–	2022
Alan Ball	England	72	1965–1975	1982–1983
Jack Ball	England	1	1928	1921–1922
Billy Beats	England	2	1901–1902	1903–1906
**Geoff Bradford**	**England**	**1**	**1955**	**1949–1964**
Cliff Britton	England	9	1935–1937	1928–1930
Mick Channon	England	46	1973–1978	1982–1983
Tommy Cook	England	1	1925	1931–1933
Terry Cooper	England	20	1969–1975	1979–1981
Keith Curle	England	3	1992	1981–1983
Ronnie Dix	England	1	1938	1927–1932
Fraser Forster	England	6	2013–2016	2009
Gerry Francis	England	12	1975–1976	1985–1988
Vivian Gibbins	England	2	1924–1925	1932–1933
George Kinsey	England	4	1892–1896	1897–1902
Rickie Lambert	England	11	2013–2014	2006–2009
Larry Lloyd	England	4	1971–1980	1968–1969
Gary Mabbutt	England	16	1982–1992	1978–1982
Nigel Martyn	England	23	1992–2002	1987–1990
Jarell Quansah	England	11	2025–	2023
John Scales	England	3	1995	1985–1987
Phil Taylor	England	3	1947	1935–1936
John Townrow	England	2	1925–1926	1932–1933
Mark Walters	England	1	1991	1999–2002
Anssi Jaakkola	Finland	3	2011–2021	2019–2023
Mustapha Carayol	Gambia	7	2015–2018	2011–2012
**Junior Agogo**	**Ghana**	**15**	**2006–2009**	**2003–2006**
Chris Dickson	Ghana	2	2008–2009	2009
Elvis Hammond	Ghana	1	2006	2001–2002
**Jake Gosling**	**Gibraltar**	**12**	**2014–2018**	**2014–2017**
**Jason Roberts**	**Grenada**	22	**1998–2008**	**1998–2000**
Oliver Norburn	Grenada	4	2021–2022	2011; 2012–2014
Deon Moore	Guyana	21	2023–	2018–2020
Ricky Shakes	Guyana	14	2011–2016	2005
Elkan Baggott	Indonesia	31	2021–	2024
**Harry Buckle**	**Ireland**	**3**	**1903**	**1907–1908**
Sam Irving	Ireland	18	1923–1931	1932–1933
Jimmy McCambridge	Ireland	4	1930–1932	1933–1936
Jonson Clarke-Harris	Jamaica	1	2022	2019–2020
Barry Hayles	Jamaica	10	2000–2003	1997–1999
Jonah Ayunga	Kenya	9	2024–	2020–2021
Peter Hooper	Kenya	1	1951	1953–1962
**Vitālijs Astafjevs**	**Latvia**	**167**	**1992–2010**	**2000–2003**
Stephan Negru	Moldova	2	2026–	2025–2026
Rory Fallon	New Zealand	23	2009–2017	2016
Joe Kissock	New Zealand	15	1923–1925	1921–1922
Paul Nixon	New Zealand	6	1988	1988–1991
**Ronnie Briggs**	**Northern Ireland**	**2**	**1962–1965**	**1965–1968**
Adrian Coote	Northern Ireland	6	1999–2000	2002–2003
Michael Forbes	Northern Ireland	1	2023–	2024–2025
Jeff Hughes	Northern Ireland	2	2005–2007	2008–2011
Frank McCourt	Northern Ireland	6	1952–1953	1949–1950
James Quinn	Northern Ireland	50	1996–2007	2001–2002
Michael Smith	Northern Ireland	19	2016–2021	2011–2014
**Luke Southwood**	**Northern Ireland**	**2**	**2021–**	**2025–2026**
Ciaran Toner	Northern Ireland	2	2003	2001–2002
**Neil Etheridge**	**Philippines**	**82**	**2008–2024**	**2012**
Graham Barrett	Republic of Ireland	7	2002–2004	2000–2001
Miah Dennehy	Republic of Ireland	11	1972–1977	1978–1980
Mickey Evans	Republic of Ireland	1	1998	2000–2001
**Joe Haverty**	**Republic of Ireland**	**32**	**1956–1967**	**1964–1965**
Liam Lawrence	Republic of Ireland	15	2009–2011	2016–2017
Harvey Vale	Republic of Ireland	4	2026–	2023–2024
Gary Waddock	Republic of Ireland	21	1980–1990	1992–1994
Glenn Whelan	Republic of Ireland	91	2008–2019	2021–2023
**Matt O'Mahoney**	(Republic of Ireland) Ireland	**7**	**1938–1939**	**1936–1939**
Romaine Sawyers	Saint Kitts and Nevis	51	2012–	2025
Calum Willock	Saint Kitts and Nevis	3	2004	2003
David Clarkson	Scotland	2	2008	2012–2014
James Howie	Scotland	3	1905–1908	1902–1903
Garry Kenneth	Scotland	2	2010	2012–2013
Bobby McKay	Scotland	1	1927	1932–1935
Chris Martin	Scotland	17	2014–2017	2023–2025
Derek Riordan	Scotland	3	2005–2009	2012
David Steele	Scotland	3	1923	1919–1922
Tommy Tait	Scotland	1	1911	1903–1906
Abdulai Bell-Baggie	Sierra Leone	5	2013–2014	2015
**Kamil Conteh**	**Sierra Leone**	**12**	**2022–**	**2024–2026**
David Murray	South Africa	21	1924	1928–1930
Kevin Austin	Trinidad and Tobago	1	1999	2002–2003
**Ronnie Mauge**	**Trinidad and Tobago**	**8**	**2000**	**1999–2002**
**Nigel Pierre**	**Trinidad and Tobago**	**35**	**2000–2003**	**1999–2000**
Billy Bodin	Wales	1	2018	2015–2018
**Marcus Browning**	**Wales**	**5**	**1996–1997**	**1989–1997**
Aaron Collins	Wales	1	2026–	2021–2024
Andy Dorman	Wales	3	2010–2011	2011–2012
Jermaine Easter	Wales	12	2007–2014	2015–2017
Christian Edwards	Wales	1	1996	2003–2006
Jack Evans	Wales	8	1912–1923	1926–1928
Brian Godfrey	Wales	3	1964–1965	1971–1973
Ryan Green	Wales	2	1998	2006–2009
Jeff Hopkins	Wales	16	1983–1990	1991–1992
**Wayne Jones**	**Wales**	**1**	**1971**	**1966–1972**
**Jack Lewis**	**Wales**	**1**	**1906**	**1899–1901**; **1904–1906**
Chris Llewellyn	Wales	6	1998–2006	2002–2003
**Tom Lockyer**	**Wales**	**16**	**2017–2023**	**2012–2019**; **2025–2026**
Tommy Mills	Wales	4	1934–1935	1936–1939
Jason Perry	Wales	1	1994	1997–1998
David Pipe	Wales	1	2006	2007–2010
Billy Richards	Wales	1	1933	1937–1938
Phillip Roberts	Wales	4	1974–1975	1969–1973
**Neil Slatter**	**Wales**	**22**	**1983–1989**	**1980–1985**
Byron Stevenson	Wales	15	1978–1982	1985–1986
Gareth Taylor	Wales	14	1995–2005	1991–1995
Martin Thomas	Wales	1	1987	1976–1982
Paul Trollope	Wales	5	1997–2003	2004–2007
**Dai Ward**	**Wales**	**2**	**1959–1962**	**1954–1961**
David Williams	Wales	5	1986–1987	1975–1985
Gavin Williams	Wales	2	2005	2011
Geraint Williams	Wales	13	1988–1996	1980–1985
James Wilson	Wales	1	2013	2023–2025

== Sources ==
- Byrne, Stephen & Jay, Mike (2003):Bristol Rovers Football Club, The Definitive History 1883–2003. ISBN 0-7524-2717-2
- Soccerbase
