= Denzil Hale =

English footballer

Personal information
- Date of birth: 9 April 1928
- Place of birth: Clevedon, England
- Date of death: 14 July 2004 (aged 76)
- Place of death: Weston-super-Mare, Somerset, England
- Height: 6 ft 1 in (1.85 m)
- Positions: Forward; centre half

Senior career*
Years	Team	Apps	(Gls)
- Yatton United
????–1951	Clevedon Town		
1951–1959	Bristol Rovers	120	(12)
1959–1962	Bath City		
1962–????	Clevedon Town		
- * Club domestic league appearances and goals

Denzil Hale (9 April 1928 – 14 July 2004) is a former professional footballer, who played in The Football League for Bristol Rovers.

Hale started playing non-League football for Yatton United and his home town team Clevedon Town before joining Bristol Rovers as an amateur in 1951. He was awarded a professional contract on 19 February 1952 and made his first team debut in a Division Two game in 1953. He initially played as an inside forward, and spent some time playing as an emergency centre forward following an injury to Geoff Bradford. He was later converted to a centre half, and played in that position for the majority of his professional career.

After playing 120 League games between 1953 and 1959 and scoring twelve goals, all in the 1953–54 season, Hale left Rovers and returned to non-League football, playing for Bath City before returning to his previous club Clevedon Town.
