= Bert Tann =

English footballer and manager

Personal information
- Full name: Bertram James Tann
- Date of birth: 4 May 1914
- Place of birth: Plaistow, England
- Date of death: 7 July 1972 (aged 58)
- Place of death: Bristol, England
- Height: 6 ft 0 in (1.83 m)
- Position: Wing-half

Senior career*
Years	Team	Apps	(Gls)
1931–1932	Clapton Orient	0	(0)
1932–1933	Romford		
1933–1939	Charlton Athletic	19	(2)

Managerial career
- 1945–: Erith & Belvedere
- 1947: Fredrikstad
- 1950–1968: Bristol Rovers
- * Club domestic league appearances and goals

Bertram James Tann (4 May 1914 – 7 July 1972) was a professional footballer and later football manager, who is best known for managing Bristol Rovers for a spell of 18 years from 1950 to 1968. He is the longest-serving post-war manager of Bristol Rovers, and their second-longest-serving of all time behind Alfred Homer.

His playing and management careers were split by the Second World War. As a player he spent time with Clapton FC and Romford before ending his official playing days with Charlton Athletic in 1939, although he did go on to make a number of guest appearances for other clubs after this date in unofficial wartime friendlies. After the hostilities ended he returned to football firstly as a coach and later as manager of Erith & Belvedere, then after a brief spell in Norway where he spent a season at the helm of Fredrikstad he took over as Bristol Rovers' boss in 1950.

== Early life ==
Tann was born in Plaistow, now part of Greater London, in May 1914, one of eleven children brought up in the family home. His father earned a living working as a ship painter in London's Docklands area. He showed an aptitude for sport throughout his childhood, and as well as playing football for London Boys, West Ham Boys and the Essex County F.A. he was also an accomplished cricketer and athlete.

== Playing career ==
Tann's career as a footballer was a relatively short one. He joined his first professional club, Charlton Athletic, in 1933 and he would spend just six years among the pro ranks before League football was put on hiatus in 1939 due to the outbreak of World War II. During this time he made just nineteen appearances in the Football League, scoring twice.

Prior to turning professional he had played as an amateur, spending a season with each of Clapton Orient (now Leyton Orient) in 1931–32 and Romford the following year, earning an income during this period working as a painter and decorator with his father. While no League football was being played during the Second World War he made guest appearances in unofficial friendly matches for Southampton, for whom he played 36 times, and West Ham United where he played just a single game.

== Coaching career ==
After the end of the Second World War Tann opted not to take up an opportunity to return to painting and decorating in the family business, but instead decided to try to forge a career in football coaching. He was able to find work as a coach with Kent side Erith & Belvedere, and it wasn't long before he was appointed as their manager. In 1947 he was one of a number of English coaches given the opportunity to travel to Norway, where he was given the role of manager with Fredrikstad FK and led them to the 1946–47 Østfoldserien championship.

He began working as a staff coach at The Football Association and from there he was taken on as a member of the coaching staff at Bristol Rovers in 1948. Eighteen months later, in January 1950, he was promoted to the job of first team manager, replacing Brough Fletcher who had held the position for the previous twelve years. It was an important moment in Rovers' history as by the end of his eighteen years in charge he would be considered one of the club's greatest ever managers.

Under Tann's leadership Rovers implemented a no-buy no-sell policy on players, meaning the squad would be built up almost entirely of men living locally and would prevent the loss of their best players to other clubs, as had happened previously when Eddie Hapgood left the club as a teenager and went on to become captain of England. The policy was a success and the club was able to build a talented team which, under Tann's leadership, they enjoyed the most successful period in the club's history. Rovers were promoted to the Football League Second Division for the first time in their history in 1952–53, and he led them to 6th-place finishes in both the 1955–56 and 1958–59 seasons, as well to the quarter-finals of the FA Cup in 1950–51 and 1957–58.

No-buy no-sell was made possible by the existence of football's maximum wage rule, which forbade clubs paying more than £20 a week in wages to any player. This rule was growing increasingly unpopular and was eventually abolished in 1961 amid threats of a strike by the players' union. The fact that they could now earn market value for their services meant that smaller clubs, like Rovers, could no longer afford to hold on to their best players as they looked for bigger pay packets elsewhere.

Tann continued as manager until 1968, but never managed the same level of success as he had during the maximum-wage era. His eighteen years at the helm make him the longest-serving post-war manager of Bristol Rovers, and the second longest of all time behind Alfred Homer.

After vacating the role of first team manager in 1968 he remained at the club and was appointed to the role of general manager and secretary, positions he held until his death five years later. On Tuesday 4 July 1972 he was admitted to hospital with heart strain and died there three days later.
