= Jimmy Haydon =

English footballer

Personal information
- Full name: James Gilbert Haydon
- Date of birth: 4 May 1901
- Place of birth: Bristol, England
- Date of death: 21 September 1969 (aged 68)
- Place of death: Bristol, England
- Height: 5 ft 9 in (1.75 m)
- Position: Full back

Youth career
- 1913–????: St Gabriel's
- Fishponds Juniors
- St Lawrence

Senior career*
Years	Team	Apps	(Gls)
????–1921	Newton Old Boys		
1921–1931	Bristol Rovers	289	(3)
1931–????	Kingswood		
- * Club domestic league appearances and goals

James Gilbert Haydon (4 May 1901 – 21 September 1969) was a professional footballer who played as a full back in the Football League for Bristol Rovers for ten years from 1921 until 1931.

Although he played youth and non-League football for other teams, Bristol Rovers were his only League side. He joined them in only their second season in the Football League, and their first in the newly created Division Three (South). He went on to play 311 league and cup games for Rovers before leaving them in 1931 and scored five goals.

At the time he left Rovers he had made the second highest number of appearances for the club by any player, behind only goalkeeper Jesse Whatley.

== Sources ==
- Jay, Mike; Byrne, Stephen (1994). Pirates in Profile: A Who's Who of Bristol Rovers Players. Bristol: Potten, Baber & Murray. p. 117. ISBN 0-9524835-0-5.
