= Stuart Taylor =

Stuart Taylor may refer to:

- Stuart Taylor (cricketer) (1900–1978), Australian cricketer
- Stuart Taylor (footballer, born 1947) (1947–2019), English former footballer for Bristol Rovers
- Stuart Taylor (footballer, born 1974), Scottish footballer and coach
- Stuart Taylor (footballer, born 1980), English football goalkeeper
- Stuart Taylor Jr., American journalist and author
- Stuart Ross Taylor (1925–2021), New Zealand-born geochemist and planetary scientist
