= Jack Smart =

Jack Smart is the name of:

- Jack Smart (footballer), English footballer
- Jack Smart (cricketer) (1891–1979), Warwickshire first-class cricketer and Test cricket umpire
- J. Scott Smart (1902–1960), American actor
- John Elliott Smart (1916–2008), Royal Navy officer
- J. J. C. Smart (1920–2012), Australian philosopher

== See also ==
- John Smart (disambiguation)
