= Football Index =

American gambling company

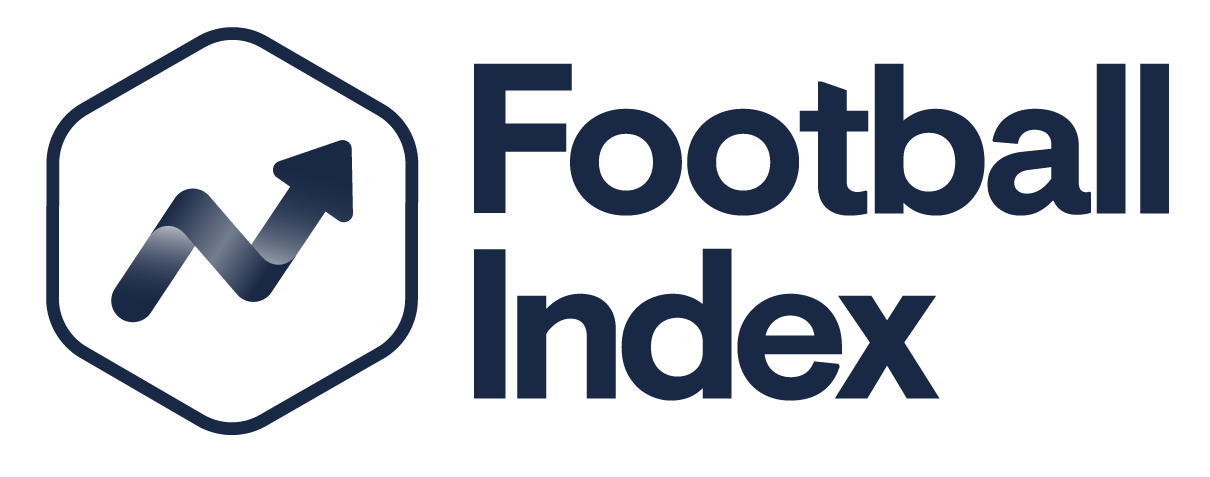
- Type: Private
- Industry: Gambling, Technology
- Founded: 2015
- Founder: Adam Cole
- Headquarters: Jersey
- Parent: Index Labs
- Website: footballindex.co.uk

Football Index was a Jersey-licensed and regulated gambling product that allowed customers to gamble on both the future success of football players and the rules of the platform itself. Customers purchased imaginary shares for the chance to win daily payouts calculated based on player performance on match days, and their presence in the platform's Media Rankings, which paid out on the top trending footballers each day.

The company entered administration in March 2021 and is currently suspended without a gambling licence.

== Company overview ==
Founder Adam Cole started Electric Video, which dealt with pre-recorded video and DVD which was later sold to Richard Desmond. He also founded MyVillage network, a website that lists local restaurants, bars and services in the UK.

BetIndex Ltd launched Football Index in October 2015 as a platform to gamble on football players. The stock exchange cap called 'The Footie' started with the launch of the platform on 2 October 2015 with a base value of 1,000 points. As of 3 April 2020, The Footie had grown to 159,207. Trader portfolios ranged from £10 to over £1,000,000, and 2% was charged as commission on sales. In January 2018, Football Index reached 100k users, and surpassed half a million traders in late 2019.

The company was owned by Index Labs, formerly Fame Ventures, who held the software license for Football Index.

During the 2018/2019 football season, over £321 million was traded on the platform, and over £4.3 million was paid out to traders through dividends.

In 2020, Football Index finalised a partnership with Nasdaq, to use Nasdaq's technology to power an order books system. In January 2021, Mike Bohan was appointed as the CEO.

=== Collapse ===
Changes were announced in March 2021 including the issue of new shares and the reduction of the "dividend" payout from a maximum of 33p per share to 6p per share. This reduced the value of all open bets, that were purchased at prices based on the higher payouts. This resulted in huge uproar from users who saw their portfolio valuation drop from 50% – 90%.

Football Index suspended trading on its platform on 11 March 2021. Within hours parent company BetIndex had gone into administration and both the UK's Gambling Commission and the Jersey Gambling Commission suspended its licence. The platform immediately ceased trading. At the time, BetIndex said customer funds were being held in a "segregated account".

The UK's Department for Digital, Culture, Media and Sport (DCMS) commissioned Malcolm Sheehan QC to investigate the role of regulators in the company's failure. Sheehan concluded that BetIndex had not properly informed the Gambling Commission (GC) of the nature of the gambling product it was offering – in particular that the Football Index product resembled a stock market. Sheehan criticised the GC for being slow to react to reports of concern regarding Football Index. A number of individuals (including an un-named competitor of BetIndex) had alleged the company was operating a Ponzi scheme; the GC concluded that it was not. Sheehan noted that the GC had concerns that Football Index might constitute a stock market, and so raised the matter with the Financial Conduct Authority (FCA), which would be the relevant regulator. Sheehan noted that discussions between the FCA and GC were lengthy and did not clearly resolve whether either or both bodies should regulate the business.

== Advertising and marketing ==
John Motson was unveiled in August 2018 as the voice of Football Index and appeared on company's television and radio adverts for the 2018–19 football season. He was joined the following month by Guillem Balagué, whose role at Football Index included hosting trader events, producing blogs and videos, and appearing on FITV. A second football expert, Raphael Honigstein, joined Football Index as a contributor in 2019.

Football Index were shirt sponsor for three EFL clubs – Bristol Rovers and Nottingham Forest from 2018 and Queens Park Rangers from 2020. After entering administration, Forest and QPR immediately dropped their sponsorship arrangements with Football Index.

== Funding ==
Football Index secured £1.92m of funding from Burlywood Capital, the venture arm of gambling veteran Mark Blandford, who founded SportingBet. In May 2016, they raised £1,156,327 through the crowdfunding platform Seedrs in exchange for 15.10% equity, at a pre-money valuation of £4,497,268.
