= Stephen Sims =

English footballer

Personal information
- Full name: Stephen Sims
- Date of birth: 11 December 1895
- Place of birth: Bedminster, England
- Date of death: February 1973 (aged 77)
- Place of death: Weston-super-Mare, England
- Height: 5 ft 10 3/4 in (1.80 m)
- Position: Defender

Senior career*
Years	Team	Apps	(Gls)
1914–1915	Leicester Fosse	11	(2)
1919–1922	Bristol Rovers	98	(17)
1922–1924	Burnley	11	(0)
1924–1925	Weymouth	?	(?)
1925–1926	Bristol City	0	(0)
1926–1927	Bristol Rovers	13	(1)
1927–1928	Newport County	4	(0)
- * Club domestic league appearances and goals

Stephen Sims (11 December 1895 – February 1973) was an English professional footballer who played as a central defender.

He was born in Bedminster, the son of Mary Jane Stenner (1870 - 1906) and Victor Sims (1868 - 1941). His father was the licensee of The Rising Sun Inn, in Bedminster.
