= John Smart (disambiguation) =

John Smart (1740–1811) was an English painter of portrait miniatures.

John Smart may also refer to:

- John Smart (landscape artist) (1838–1899), Scottish painter
- John Elliott Smart (1916–2008), officer in the Royal Navy
- John Smart (skier) (born 1965), Canadian freestyle skier
- John Karefa-Smart (1915–2010), politician from Sierra Leone

== See also ==
- Jack Smart (disambiguation)
