= Billy Clark (footballer, born 1881) =

Scottish footballer

Personal information
- Full name: William Clark
- Date of birth: 1881
- Place of birth: Airdrie, Scotland
- Date of death: 17 March 1937 (aged 55–56)
- Place of death: Bristol, England
- Position: Outside right

Senior career*
Years	Team	Apps	(Gls)
–	Cambuslang Hibernian		
1901–1904	Port Glasgow Athletic	60	(18)
1904–1908	Bristol Rovers	133	(35)
1908–1909	Sunderland	41	(4)
1910	Bristol City	24	(1)
1911	Leicester Fosse	6	(1)
Total		264	(59)
- * Club domestic league appearances and goals

William Clark (1881 – 17 March 1937) was a Scottish professional footballer who played in the Southern League for Bristol Rovers. He was signed from Port Glasgow Athletic in 1904 and won the Southern League championship in his first season with the club. He went on to make 133 League appearances, scoring 35 goals, before leaving to join Sunderland.

During his time at Bristol Rovers, Clark (an outside right) played in one Home Scots v Anglo-Scots international trial in 1908 but never gained a full cap for Scotland.

== Sources ==
- Byrne, Stephen; Jay, Mike (2003). Bristol Rovers Football Club - The Definitive History 1883-2003. Stroud: Tempus. ISBN 0-7524-2717-2.
