= Bobby Jones (footballer, born 1938) =

English footballer and manager

Personal information
- Full name: Robert Stanley Jones
- Date of birth: 28 October 1938
- Place of birth: Bristol, England
- Date of death: 22 July 2015 (aged 76)
- Place of death: Bristol, England
- Position: Forward

Youth career
- Soundwell

Senior career*
Years	Team	Apps	(Gls)
1956–1966	Bristol Rovers	250	(64)
1966	Northampton Town	17	(1)
1967	Swindon Town	11	(0)
1967–1973	Bristol Rovers	171	(37)
1973–19??	Minehead		
1977–????	Paulton Rovers		

Managerial career
- 1977–????: Paulton Rovers
- 1982–1988: Bath City
- 1990–1991: Forest Green Rovers
- 1991–1994: Mangotsfield United
- 1994–????: Yate Town
- 1995–1997: Oldland
- * Club domestic league appearances and goals

Robert Stanley Jones (28 October 1938 – 22 July 2015) was an English professional footballer who played as a forward for Bristol Rovers, Northampton Town and Swindon Town in the Football League, and for non-league sides Soundwell and Minehead.

He subsequently became player-manager of Paulton Rovers, before returning to Bristol Rovers as youth coach in January 1980. He later became manager of Bath City, Forest Green Rovers, Mangotsfield United, Yate Town and Oldland.

== Honours ==
Individual

Football Conference Manager of the Month: March 1987

== Sources ==
- Byrne, Stephen; Jay, Mike (2003). Bristol Rovers Football Club - The Definitive History 1883-2003. Stroud: Tempus. ISBN 0-7524-2717-2.
- "Bobby Jones". Post War English & Scottish Football League A–Z Player's Transfer Database. Neil Brown.
