= Jack Smart (footballer) =

English footballer

Personal information
- Birth name: John Smart
- Date of birth: Unknown
- Place of birth: Kingswood, England
- Position: Centre half

Senior career*
Years	Team	Apps	(Gls)
????–1905	Bristol East		
1905–1910	Bristol Rovers	105	(3)
1910–????	Reading		
- * Club domestic league appearances and goals

John 'Jack' Smart was a professional footballer who played for Bristol Rovers and Reading in the early twentieth century. He was born in Kingswood in what is now South Gloucestershire and after starting out with Bristol East went on to play 105 games for Bristol Rovers in the Southern League, scoring twice. He moved to Reading from Rovers in 1910. Unfortunately Smart disappeared after being sent to serve in World War I, it is widely believed he was killed.

== Sources ==
- Byrne, Stephen; Jay, Mike (2003). Bristol Rovers Football Club - The Definitive History 1883-2003. Stroud: Tempus. p. 492. ISBN 0-7524-2717-2.
