= Jesse Whatley =

English footballer and manager

- Whatley in 1925

Personal information
- Full name: Jesse Winter Whatley
- Date of birth: 20 January 1895
- Place of birth: Trowbridge, England
- Date of death: 19 March 1982 (aged 87)
- Place of death: Chipping Sodbury, England
- Height: 6 ft 1 in (1.85 m)
- Position: Goalkeeper

Senior career*
Years	Team	Apps	(Gls)
1919	Trowbridge Town		
1919–1930	Bristol Rovers	386	(0)

Managerial career
- 1939–1943: Downend
- 1943–????: Soundwell
- * Club domestic league appearances and goals

Jesse Winter Whatley (20 January 1895 – 19 March 1982) was an association footballer who spent his entire professional career at Bristol Rovers.

Known as "Gentleman Jess" through his footballing career, Whatley started playing competitive football in the British Army and represented an Egyptian Army XI in games against Belgium and France. While in the Army he served in the 1st and 3rd Battalions of the Wiltshire Regiment during World War I. Following the war he joined Trowbridge Town in August 1919, and after just two months playing in the Wiltshire League he was snapped up by Southern League side Bristol Rovers.

Despite conceding five goals to Norwich City on his Rovers debut he went on to become a first team regular for The Pirates, playing in 246 consecutive League games between August 1922 and April 1928, a Football League record for most consecutive games that stood until 1953. By the time he retired from professional football in 1930 he had played 386 League games for Rovers; 14 in the Southern League and 372 in the Football League. He continued playing non-League football in Bristol for a further two years, for Stapleton Institute and Mental Institution Club, later moving into coaching, becoming coach of Fry's Cocoa Tree Boys in 1937. In 1939 he was appointed as manager of Downend Football Club, and two years later he took charge of Soundwell.

Following the end of his playing days he worked on a farm in Westerleigh, Gloucestershire.

== Career statistics ==
The table below shows Whatley's league appearances in each season. Cup games are not counted here.

Season	Club	League	Apps	Goals
1919–20	Trowbridge Town	Wiltshire League	?	?
1919–20	Bristol Rovers	Southern League First Division	14	0
1920–21	Bristol Rovers	Football League Third Division	39	0
1921–22	Bristol Rovers	Football League Third Division South	20	0
1922–23	Bristol Rovers	Football League Third Division South	42	0
1923–24	Bristol Rovers	Football League Third Division South	42	0
1924–25	Bristol Rovers	Football League Third Division South	42	0
1925–26	Bristol Rovers	Football League Third Division South	42	0
1926–27	Bristol Rovers	Football League Third Division South	42	0
1927–28	Bristol Rovers	Football League Third Division South	36	0
1928–29	Bristol Rovers	Football League Third Division South	41	0
1922–23	Bristol Rovers	Football League Third Division South	26	0

== Sources ==
- Jay, Mike; Byrne, Stephen (1994). Pirates in Profile: A Who's Who of Bristol Rovers Players. Bristol: Potten, Baber & Murray. pp. 286–287. ISBN 0-9524835-0-5.
