= Harry Bamford =

English footballer (1920–1958)

- Bamford at Bristol Rovers' Eastville Stadium

Personal information
- Full name: Henry Charles Bamford
- Date of birth: 8 February 1920
- Place of birth: Bristol, [Bristol]], England
- Date of death: 31 October 1958 (aged 38)
- Place of death: Bristol,Bristol, England
- Position: Defender

Youth career
- St. Silas School; Bristol Boys

Senior career*
Years	Team	Apps	(Gls)
- St. George's Brewery, Bristol & District League
1945–1958	Bristol Rovers	486	(5)
- * Club domestic league appearances and goals

Henry Charles Bamford (8 February 1920 – 31 October 1958) was a professional footballer, who played for Bristol Rovers for his entire professional career.

A local man, born and raised in St. Philip's Marsh, he played chiefly as a right-back for the club for thirteen years from 1945 until his death in 1958, making 486 league appearances and scoring five goals in the process. Never sent off, booked or even spoken to by a referee, he gained a reputation for sportmanship and gentlemanly conduct. An unflappable, cultured right back, who preferred, sometimes to the disquiet of managers and supporters alike, to play the ball out of defence even in the tightest of situations, he never lost the attacking instincts of the forward he had been in his younger days, and operated very much in the style of a modern wing-back. Bamford was an integral part of the Rovers' side which won promotion from Division Three (South) to Division Two in 1953 under manager Bert Tann.

Bamford joined Rovers in December 1945, having been spotted while playing for St. Silas School Old Boys. Before his call-up in 1939 to the First Battalion of the Gloucestershire Regiment where he played at a high level for Army football and rugby teams in Burma and India, he had played for local Bristol teams as a forward, including his school St. Silas, winning three caps for and captaining Bristol Boys, and also playing briefly for Bristol City Colts. He had also signed amateur forms with Ipswich Town. Because of the war, his professional career began at the relatively late age of 25, but in spite of this he played in the second highest number of Bristol Rovers games of any players at the club, behind only Stuart Taylor.

In the summer of 1951, Bamford was part of an England 'B' XI that toured Australia drawing huge crowds.

While still a player, Bamford had become a qualified FA coach. He was riding his motorcycle to a coaching session with the boys of Clark's Grammar School in Clifton on 28 October 1958 when he was involved in a collision with a delivery van in Apsley Road. He remained in Frenchay Hospital for three days before dying from his injuries on 31 October.

Bamford had been a regular for Rovers until an injury in the 3 September 1958 game against Derby County meant he was replaced by Brian Doyle and, even when fit again, was playing in the Reserves.

His funeral was held at the church of St. Mary Redcliffe on Thursday 6 November 1958 and was attended by over a thousand people. Many more lined the route taken by the cortege to Arnos Vale Cemetery. A fund set up for his widow Violet and two daughters (one born posthumously), The Harry Bamford Memorial Fund, raised over £6,000, swelled by the proceeds of a memorial game between a Combined Bristol XI and Arsenal on 8 May 1959.

== Legacy ==
After his death the Harry Bamford memorial trophy was created in his honour. This was to be awarded every year to the Bristol footballer, amateur or professional, who best emulated Bamford's sportsmanship and dedication. The awards ceased in 1973.The trophy was lost in 1980 when Rovers' Eastville Stadium sustained serious fire damage. However, it resurfaced in 2014, having been found in a dusty box. In 2014, the trophy was revived and presentations were made at the Memorial Ground and Ashton Gate to 40 ex-Bristol Rovers, Bristol City and amateur players nominated by the public, for each of the 40 seasons for which it had been in abeyance. A second junior trophy, also anonymously donated in 1967, was similarly revived. In 2019 it was decided to discontinue the junior trophy which had only been awarded originally on three occasions and that a new trophy should be made to replace it in memory of Michael (Mickey) Barrett, another Bristol Rovers player who died of cancer at the age of 24 in 1984. It will be awarded annually to a Bristol Rovers youth player who conducts himself in a professional and sportsmanlike manner on and off the pitch to inspire younger players to uphold the best traditions of the game. On 12 March 2021, Bamford was the third player to be inducted in the Bristol Rovers Hall of Fame.

== Sources ==
Byrne, Stephen; Jay, Mike (2003). Bristol Rovers Football Club — The Definitive History 1883-2003. Stroud: Tempus. pp. 255–256 & 494. ISBN 0-7524-2717-2.

Lewis, Hilary; Woolridge, Joyce; Sutor, Steve (2017). Harry Bamford: Bristol Rovers' First Gentleman of Football. Bristol, Tangent Books. ISBN 9781910089675
