= Ron Gingell =

English footballer, scout, and manager

Ron Gingell (born 22 October 1920 – October 1988) was an English professional footballer, football scout and manager. He assumed the name "Ron" as he disliked his birth names "Claude Samuel".

Gingell, who was born in Warmley, near Keynsham, played as a full back for Exeter City before World War II, and for Chelsea, Liverpool and Bury as a wartime guest. After the war, he signed for Cheltenham Town. He later became chief scout for Bristol Rovers, and became their caretaker manager for one game in 1981 at the age of 61, following the departure of Terry Cooper from the club.
