= Ray Warren (footballer) =

English footballer (1918–1988)

Personal information
- Full name: Raymond Richard Warren
- Date of birth: 23 June 1918
- Place of birth: Bristol, England
- Date of death: 13 March 1988 (aged 69)
- Place of death: Bristol, England
- Height: 5 ft 8 in (1.73 m)
- Position: Defender

Youth career
- Parson Street Old Boys

Senior career*
Years	Team	Apps	(Gls)
1936–1956	Bristol Rovers	450	(28)
- * Club domestic league appearances and goals

Raymond Richard Warren (23 June 1918 – 13 March 1988) was a professional footballer who spent his entire career at Bristol Rovers. He joined the club on 12 March 1936, at the age of 17, and spent twenty years playing as a centre-half with the Eastville club until retiring in 1956. On 26 March 2021, Warren became the fifth player to be inducted into the newly created Bristol Rovers Hall of Fame.

== See also ==
- One club men
