= Matt O'Mahoney =

Irish footballer

Personal information
- Full name: Matthew Thomas O'Mahoney
- Date of birth: 19 January 1913
- Place of birth: Mullinavat, County Kilkenny, Ireland
- Date of death: 1992 (aged 78–79)
- Position: Centre half

Senior career*
Years	Team	Apps	(Gls)
1933	Liverpool	0	(0)
1933	New Brighton	0	(0)
193x–1935	Hoylake F.C.		
1935	Southport	12	(0)
1935–1936	Wolves	0	(0)
1936	Newport County	8	(0)
1936–1939	Bristol Rovers	101	(6)
1939–1949	Ipswich Town	97	(8)
1939–1940	→ Bristol Rovers (guest)	24	(4)
1940–1941	→ Bristol City (guest)	4	(0)
1943–1944	→ Rochdale (guest)	3	(0)
1942–1944	→ Aberaman Athletic (guest)		
1944–1945	→ Tranmere Rovers (guest)	3	(0)
1949–19xx	Yarmouth Town		

International career
1938–1939	Ireland (FAI)	6	(0)
1938	Ireland (IFA)	1	(0)
- * Club domestic league appearances and goals

Matt O'Mahoney (19 January 1913 – 1992) was an Irish footballer who played for, among others, Bristol Rovers and Ipswich Town. O'Mahoney was a dual international and played for both Ireland teams – the FAI XI and the IFA XI.

== Club career ==
=== Early years ===
Before establishing himself at Bristol Rovers, O'Mahoney was something of an underachieving journeyman player. He had initially been on the books of several teams in the Merseyside area and had spent uninspiring spells at both Liverpool and New Brighton before eventually making something of a breakthrough at Southport, where he made 12 league appearances. He then joined Wolves but failed to make it into the first team. After a brief spell with Newport County, where he made 8 league appearances, he signed for Bristol Rovers in May 1936.

=== Bristol Rovers ===
Between 1936 and 1939, O'Mahoney went onto make 101 English League appearances, scoring 6 goals, for Bristol Rovers. He also made a further 4 appearances for Rovers in the FA Cup. O'Mahoney also won all 7 of his international caps while playing for Rovers. During the Second World War he returned to Rovers as a guest player and made 24 South West League appearances and scored 4 goals in the 1939–40 season. He also scored 1 Wartime cup goal for Rovers.

=== Ipswich Town ===
In July 1939, O'Mahoney signed for Ipswich Town. However within a few months the Second World War broke out and Town did not enter any of the wartime regional leagues. After playing just 3 league games for the club he returned to Bristol Rovers as a guest. During the 1940–41 season he also played 4 games for Bristol City in the Southern Regional Division and between 1942 and 1944 he guested regularly for Aberaman Athletic in the Football League West. O'Mahoney returned to Ipswich Town when they resumed playing in the 1945–46 season, making 36 league appearances and scoring 3 goals. During three more seasons with Town he made a further 58 appearances and scored 5 goals in the English League. He made his last appearance for Town on 16 October 1948 in a Third Division South game against Norwich City.

== Irish international ==
When O'Mahoney began his international career in 1938 there were, in effect, two Ireland teams, chosen by two rival associations. Both associations, the Northern Ireland – based IFA and the Irish Free State – based FAI claimed jurisdiction over the whole of Ireland and selected players from the whole island. As a result, several notable Irish players from this era, including O'Mahoney, played for both teams.

=== FAI XI ===
Between 1938 and 1939 O'Mahoney played 6 times for the FAI XI. He made his first two appearances for the FAI XI in May 1938 during a European tour. On 18 May he played in a 2–2 draw with Czechoslovakia and then on 22 May he played in a 6–0 defeat against Poland. The highlight of his international career came during his third game against Switzerland on 18 September 1938. O'Mahoney earned the unusual distinction of becoming the first FAI XI international to fly in for a home game. He arrived from Bristol only an hour before kick-off, but proceeded to play superbly, helping the FAI XI to a 4–0 win. On 13 November 1938 he played in a winning FAI XI for the second time when he helped them beat Poland 3–2 in another home game. O'Mahoney made his final two appearances for the FAI XI in May 1939 during another European tour, helping them to 2–2 and 1–1 draws with Hungary and Germany respectively. These were the last two internationals that the FAI XI played before the start of the Second World War.

=== IFA XI ===
O'Mahoney made his 1 and only appearance for the IFA XI on 8 November 1938 in a 2–0 defeat against Scotland at Windsor Park. He had earned an IFA XI call up after his impressive performance for the FAI XI against Switzerland the previous month. He was the only debutant on the day and his teammates included fellow dual internationalists Tommy Breen, Jackie Brown, Jimmy McAlinden and Alex Stevenson.

== Sources ==
- The Boys in Green – The FAI International Story (1997): Sean Ryan
- Soccer at War – 1939 – 45 (2005): Jack Rollin
