= Wayne Jones (footballer) =

Welsh footballer

Personal information
- Full name: Philip Wayne Jones
- Date of birth: 20 October 1948 (age 78)
- Place of birth: Treorchy, Wales
- Position: Midfielder

Senior career*
Years	Team	Apps	(Gls)
1966–1973	Bristol Rovers	224	(28)

International career
????–1971	Wales under-23s	6	(0)
1971	Wales	1	(0)
- * Club domestic league appearances and goals

Philip Wayne Jones (born 20 October 1948) is a Welsh former professional association footballer who spent his entire club career with Bristol Rovers, and was capped once by the Wales national football team. Following his retirement from playing, he worked as a physio, coach and assistant manager for a number of different teams in The Football League.

== Playing career ==
Jones joined Bristol Rovers as an amateur in July 1966, and it wasn't long before he had impressed the club's management enough to earn a professional contract, which he signed three months later in October. He made his first team debut later that season, on 25 February 1967 against Doncaster Rovers, and went on to make a further six appearances in The Football League during the 1966–67 campaign. In all he made 224 League appearances for Rovers, 6 of which were from the bench, and scored 28 goals.

His international career consisted of six appearances for the Wales national under-23 football team and one for the Welsh senior national team, and he was also selected to tour Australia and New Zealand with the Football Association of Wales in 1971.

The end of Jones's playing career came when he was aged just 24, when on 4 November 1972 he fell to the ground clutching his knee during a game against Brentford. It was initially believed to be a cartilage injury, but it later emerged that he had a previously undiagnosed arthritic condition that meant he was never able to play again.

=== International appearances ===
Date	Venue	Home	Result	Away
26 May 1971	Olympiastadion, Helsinki	Finland	0–1	Wales

== Post-playing career ==
After his playing career had reached a premature end, Jones trained initially as a sports physiotherapist and later as a coach and continued working within football in various capacities. In December 1977 he was appointed as Shrewsbury Town's physio, and in 1983 he returned to his former club Bristol Rovers as assistant manager to David Williams.

He had a brief spell as a coach at Al-Rayyan Sports Club in 1985, before joining Notts County as physio later in the same year. Notts County later gave him the job of reserve team coach, but he left them in 1991 to take over the physio duties with Huddersfield Town. In September 1994 he returned to Notts County as assistant manager when Russell Slade was appointed as their caretaker boss. He worked as a coach with Gillingham until being sacked in 2004, whereupon he returned to working as a physio, this time with Hereford United, before joining Yeovil Town in the same capacity in 2008. He was released by Yeovil at the end of the 2008–09 season, much to his disappointment.

His career as a physio continued when he spent the 2009–10 season with Aldershot Town, and as at September 2011 he is working at Newport County.
