= Jack Pitt =

English footballer (1920–2004)

Personal information
- Full name: John Harry Pitt
- Date of birth: 20 May 1920
- Place of birth: Willenhall, England
- Date of death: 17 August 2004 (aged 84)
- Place of death: Bristol, England
- Position: Wing half

Senior career*
Years	Team	Apps	(Gls)
1937–19??	West Bromwich Albion	0	(0)
19??–1946	Bath City		
1946–1960	Bristol Rovers	499	(16)
- * Club domestic league appearances and goals

Jack Pitt (20 May 1920 – 17 August 2004) was a former professional footballer who spent the majority of his career at Bristol Rovers. His testimonial match was at Bath on 13 August 1988 against Wimbledon. Pitt spent more than 50 years at Bristol Rovers as a player, coach and groundsman. He was part of the half back line "Pitt, Warren and Sampson" that guided the Rovers to promotion to Division Two in 1953 and sustained them in their early years there. A hard tackling half-back, Jackie was known for his rivalry with Bristol City's equally tough defender, Ernie Peacock. J On 3 April 2021, Pitt was the sixth player to be inducted into the recently created Bristol Rovers Hall of Fame.
