= Alfred Homer =

English football manager and secretary (1870–1937)

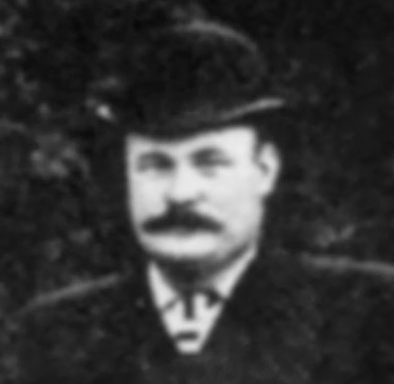

Personal information
- Full name: Alfred George Homer
- Date of birth: 1870
- Place of birth: Birmingham, England
- Date of death: 7 January 1937 (aged 66–67)
- Place of death: Bristol, England

Managerial career
- Years: Team
- 1899–1920: Bristol Rovers

Alfred George Homer, Jr. (1870 – 7 January 1937) was an English professional football manager.

Homer was born in Birmingham. He became Bristol Rovers' first full-time manager-secretary in 1899, a job he held for twenty-one years until 1920. Prior to this he was assistant secretary of Aston Villa.

Homer's father, also called Alfred Homer, founded the Vulcan Brewery in Aston, Birmingham, in 1878. The business was later sold in 1899 to Mitchells & Butlers, before the brewery site was sold to HP Foods for an HP Sauce factory.

Homer died in Bristol on 7 January 1937 at the age of 66.
