= Mike Barrett (footballer) =

English footballer (1959–1984)

Personal information
- Full name: Michael John Barrett
- Date of birth: 12 September 1959
- Place of birth: Bristol, England
- Date of death: 14 August 1984 (aged 24)
- Place of death: Bristol, England
- Position: Winger

Senior career*
Years	Team	Apps	(Gls)
1976–1979	Shirehampton Sports		
1979–1984	Bristol Rovers	129	(18)
- * Club domestic league appearances and goals

Michael John Barrett (12 September 1959 – 14 August 1984) was an English professional footballer who played as a winger for Bristol Rovers from 1979 until his death in 1984.

== Early life ==
Barrett was born in Bristol and was a pupil at St Bede's Catholic College until 1978. After leaving school he had a trial with Bristol City, but was not offered a professional contract, leading him to play non-League football in Bristol for Shirehampton Sports.

== Career ==
In 1979, Barrett earned a chance with a Football League side when he was signed by Bristol Rovers, but it was some time before he established himself as a first team regular, making just three appearances in his first season with The Pirates. In all he played in 129 League games for Rovers, scoring 18 goals in his five seasons there. During the 1983–84 season he had the chance to move to Gillingham for a fee of £10000 but opted to stay at his local club

Barrett had struggled with fitness during a training session in 1984, and after being taken to hospital for tests he was diagnosed with lung cancer. He died just two weeks later on 14 August 1984 at the age of 24, six weeks before the birth of his son, Liam. Rovers played two testimonial matches for him that autumn, against Aston Villa and his previous team Shirehampton Sports.

On 16 April 2021, Barrett was the eighth player to be inducted into the official Bristol Rovers Hall of Fame.
