= Stuart Taylor (footballer, born 1947) =

English footballer (1947–2019)

Personal information
- Date of birth: 8 April 1947
- Place of birth: Bristol, England
- Date of death: 10 October 2019 (aged 72)
- Place of death: Southmead Hospital, England
- Position: Central defender

Senior career*
Years	Team	Apps	(Gls)
	Bristol City (amateur)	0	(0)
- Oldland Abbotonians
????–1965	Hanham Athletic		
1965–1980	Bristol Rovers	546	(28)
1980–82	Bath City		

Managerial career
- 1980–82: Bath City
- * Club domestic league appearances and goals

Stuart Taylor (8 April 1947 – 10 October 2019) was an English professional footballer who played as a defender. He spent his entire professional playing career at Bristol Rovers and holds the club record for most league appearances by any player, with 546 league games played in his fifteen years at the club.

== Career ==
Taylor initially played as an amateur for Rovers' local rivals Bristol City, and also had spells with Oldland Abbotonians and Hanham Athletic in what is now South Gloucestershire. His big break came when he signed for Bristol Rovers as an apprentice in August 1965, and he went on to sign professional terms with the club just four months later, on 30 December 1965.

At 6 ft 5 in (1.96 m) and weighing in at 14 st 6 lbs (91.6 kg), Taylor was known as a giant of a defender; in fact, in 1994, it was reported that he was the tallest man ever to have played for Bristol Rovers. As well as his size, he was also known for his stamina, and between 1968 and 1973 he played in 207 consecutive Football League matches for The Pirates: a post-war club record that still stands as of 2021.

In 1980, he turned down the offer of a one-year contract with Chelsea, choosing instead to take up a position as player-manager of non-league Bath City. He later managed and played for Cadbury Heath Reserves, where he played a number of seasons at the heart of the defence alongside his son, Richard.

He had originally trained as a plumber in case his footballing career did not work out, and in February 2008 was reported to be working as a plumber in Bristol. Other post-football jobs included working as a nightclub owner, a publican, and a brief spell as commercial manager of Bristol Rovers.

Taylor continued attending Bristol Rovers games as a spectator later in life, and in 2015 he was awarded the Harry Bamford Trophy – a trophy presented to Bristol sportsmen to recognise sportsmanship and fair play.

He died at the age of 72 on 10 October 2019. His death was officially announced on the morning of the following day.

On 5 March 2021, Taylor became the second player to be added to the Bristol Rovers Hall of Fame, joining record goalscorer Geoff Bradford.

== Bibliography ==
- Byrne, Stephen; Jay, Mike (2003). Bristol Rovers Football Club: The Definitive History 1883–2003. Stroud: Tempus. ISBN 0-7524-2717-2.
- Jay, Mike; Byrne, Stephen (1994). Pirates in Profile: A Who's Who of Bristol Rovers Players. Bristol: Potten, Baber & Murray. ISBN 0-9524835-0-5.
