= Brough Fletcher =

English footballer and manager

Personal information
- Full name: Brough Fletcher
- Date of birth: 9 March 1893
- Place of birth: Mealsgate, England
- Date of death: 12 May 1972 (aged 79)
- Place of death: Bristol, England
- Height: 5 ft 8 in (1.73 m)
- Positions: Inside right; right half

Senior career*
Years	Team	Apps	(Gls)
1912–1913	Chilton Colliery Recreation Athletic		
1913–1914	Shildon Athletic		
1913–1926	Barnsley	249	(51)
1917	→ Partick Thistle (guest)	10	(0)
1926	Sheffield Wednesday	2	(0)
1926–1929	Barnsley	62	(21)

Managerial career
- 1930–1937: Barnsley
- 1938–1950: Bristol Rovers
- 1952–1953: Walsall
- Eastville
- * Club domestic league appearances and goals

Brough Fletcher (9 March 1893 – 12 May 1972) was a footballer and football manager.

He played for Sheffield Wednesday, Partick Thistle and Barnsley and managed Barnsley, Bristol Rovers and Walsall.

He scored the only goal of the game in Barnsley's shock FA Cup first-round victory in 1920 at champions elect West Bromwich Albion.

== Personal life ==
Fletcher served as a gunner in the Royal Field Artillery during the First World War.

== Honours ==
=== As a manager ===
Barnsley

- Football League Third Division North: 1933–34
