= Phil Bater =

Welsh footballer and manager (born 1955)

Personal information
- Full name: Philip Thomas Bater
- Date of birth: 26 October 1955 (age 71)
- Place of birth: Cardiff, Wales
- Height: 5 ft 10 1/2 in (1.79 m)
- Position: Defender

Senior career*
Years	Team	Apps	(Gls)
1974–1981	Bristol Rovers	212	(2)
1981–1983	Wrexham	73	(1)
1983–1986	Bristol Rovers	98	(1)
1986–1987	Brentford	19	(2)
1987–1989	Cardiff City	76	(0)
1990	Gloucester City	2	(0)

International career
1976–1977	Wales U21	2	(0)

Managerial career
- 2002: Bristol Rovers (caretaker)
- 2004: Bristol Rovers (caretaker)
- 2007–2008: Clevedon Town
- 2009–2012: Mangotsfield United
- 2017–2021: Larkhall Athletic
- 2022: Mangotsfield United
- * Club domestic league appearances and goals

Philip Thomas Bater (born 26 October 1955) is a Welsh former professional footballer turned manager who was recently in charge of Mangotsfield United.

Originally from Cardiff, Bater began his career as an apprentice with Bristol Rovers in 1973. He made 310 league appearances in two spells at the club, and also played for Wrexham, Brentford and Cardiff City He was also capped by Wales U-21. before ending his playing days at Gloucester City and starting up a landscape gardening business

After retiring as a player, Bater held a number of coaching positions at Bristol Rovers, including youth team coach and caretaker manager for the first team, and he also started a landscape gardening business. Since then he has been manager of Clevedon Town, and in 2009 became manager of Mangotsfield United leading the club to the playoffs in 2011, he left in April 2012.

In January 2017, Bater was appointed manager of Larkhall Athletic, replacing his son Geraint in the position.

Bater resigned as manager of Larkhall Athletic in November 2021.

On 2 November 2022, Bater returned to manage Mangotsfield United for a second spell.

On 22 November 2022, Bater resigned as Mangotsfield United manager after 19 days in charge.
