= Geoff Bradford =

English footballer (1927–1994)

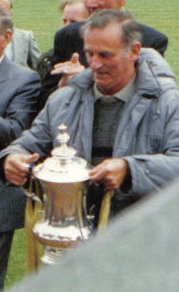
- Bradford in 1988, holding the FA Cup

Personal information
- Full name: Geoffrey Reginald William Bradford
- Date of birth: 18 July 1927
- Place of birth: Bristol, England
- Date of death: 30 December 1994 (aged 67)
- Place of death: Bristol, England
- Position: Centre-forward

Youth career
- 19??–1949: Soundwell

Senior career*
Years	Team	Apps	(Gls)
1949–1964	Bristol Rovers	461	(242)

International career
1955	England	1	(1)
- * Club domestic league appearances and goals

Geoffrey Reginald William Bradford (18 July 1927 – 30 December 1994) was an English professional footballer who spent his entire career at Bristol Rovers and won one international cap for England.

== Career ==
Bradford was discovered by Rovers at the age of 18, playing for local side Soundwell, and made his debut in a Football League Third Division South game against Crystal Palace on 24 September 1949. It was a low-key debut in a 1–0 defeat.

Nicknamed "Rip", after Rip Van Winkle, by teammates because he was known for sleeping before games, Bradford was fiercely loyal to Bristol Rovers, even turning down an offer from manager Bill Shankly to take him to Liverpool in 1961.

The highlight of his career came on 2 October 1955 when he made his first and only appearance for England. He lined up alongside such greats as Billy Wright, Jackie Milburn, Nat Lofthouse and Tom Finney in a friendly match against Denmark in Copenhagen and scored the fifth goal in a 5–1 victory. The other goals were scored by Lofthouse (2) and Don Revie (2), with Knud Lundberg scoring Denmark's only goal.

Geoff Bradford is the most successful player in the history of Bristol Rovers, and still holds the club records for most goals scored in a season (33) and most career league goals (242). Over the course of his 15-year career with Rovers he played a total of 626 competitive matches, including 14 representative matches, 10 Western League games and 73 reserve team games, scoring a total of 355 goals, which included 24 hat-tricks and goals in 15 consecutive seasons. He also played in every outfield position for the club, and remains the only player to represent England while on the books of Bristol Rovers.

On 26 February 2021, Geoff was the first player inducted into the Official Bristol Rovers Hall of Fame.

== Personal life ==
He continued to live in Bristol for the rest of his life, working as a petrol tanker driver after his retirement from the game in 1964.

He died in Bristol on 30 December 1994.

== See also ==
- One-club man
