= Bristol Rovers F.C. =

Association football club in England

Bristol Rovers
- Full name: Bristol Rovers Football Club
- Nicknames: The Pirates; The Gas
- Founded: 1883; 143 years ago
- Ground: Memorial Stadium
- Capacity: 12,534
- Owner: Hussain AlSaeed
- Head coach: Steve Evans
- League: EFL League Two
- 2025–26: EFL League Two, 14th of 24
- Website: bristolrovers.co.uk
Home colours	Away colours

Bristol Rovers Football Club is a professional association football club in Bristol, England. The team competes in EFL League Two, the fourth level of the English football league system. The club is affiliated to Bristol Rovers W.F.C., whose team play in the FA Women's National League.

Rovers was founded in 1883 as Black Arabs F.C. and entered the Bristol & District League as Eastville Rovers in 1892. They moved to Eastville Stadium in 1897, when they joined the Birmingham & District League. Two years later, now called Bristol Rovers, they joined the Southern League. Rovers won the Southern League in 1904–05 and were admitted to the Football League in 1920. They were allocated to the Third Division South, and remained there until winning promotion as champions in 1952–53. They recorded their highest Football League position, sixth place in the Second Division, in each of the 1955–56 and 1958–59 seasons. Rovers were relegated in 1962. Promoted as Third Division runners-up in 1973–74, they spent another seven seasons in the second tier until relegation in 1981. Following the sale of the land at Eastville in 1986, the club spent ten years at Twerton Park in Bath. Rovers won the Third Division title in 1989–90, and spent three seasons in the second tier before relegation in 1993. In 1996, the club relocated to its current home venue at the Memorial Stadium in Horfield.

Another relegation took the team down to the fourth tier ahead of the 2001–02 season. Rovers won the 2007 Football League Two play-off final, but relegations in 2011 and 2014 saw the club drop into the Conference Premier. They finished second in the Conference under the stewardship of Darrell Clarke and immediately regained their Football League status with victory in the 2015 Conference Premier play-off final. They followed up this success by gaining promotion out of League Two at the end of the 2015–16 season. They were relegated from the third tier in 2020–21 but returned at the first attempt, claiming the final automatic promotion spot to League One in dramatic style. However, they were relegated back to League Two at the end of the 2024–25 season.

The club's official nickname is "The Pirates", reflecting the maritime history of Bristol, but they are known locally as "The Gas", derived from the gasworks next to their former home, Eastville Stadium. "The Gas" was originally a derogatory term used by fans of neighbouring Bristol City, but it was affectionately adopted by the club and its supporters. Matches between the two Bristol clubs are known as the Bristol Derby last being played in 2013, with Bristol City coming out victorious at Ashton Gate. Besides their various divisional titles and promotions, Rovers have won the Gloucestershire Cup 32 times. They won the Third Division South Cup in 1932, the Watney Cup in 1972, and have been Football League Trophy finalists twice.

== History ==
=== Early years ===
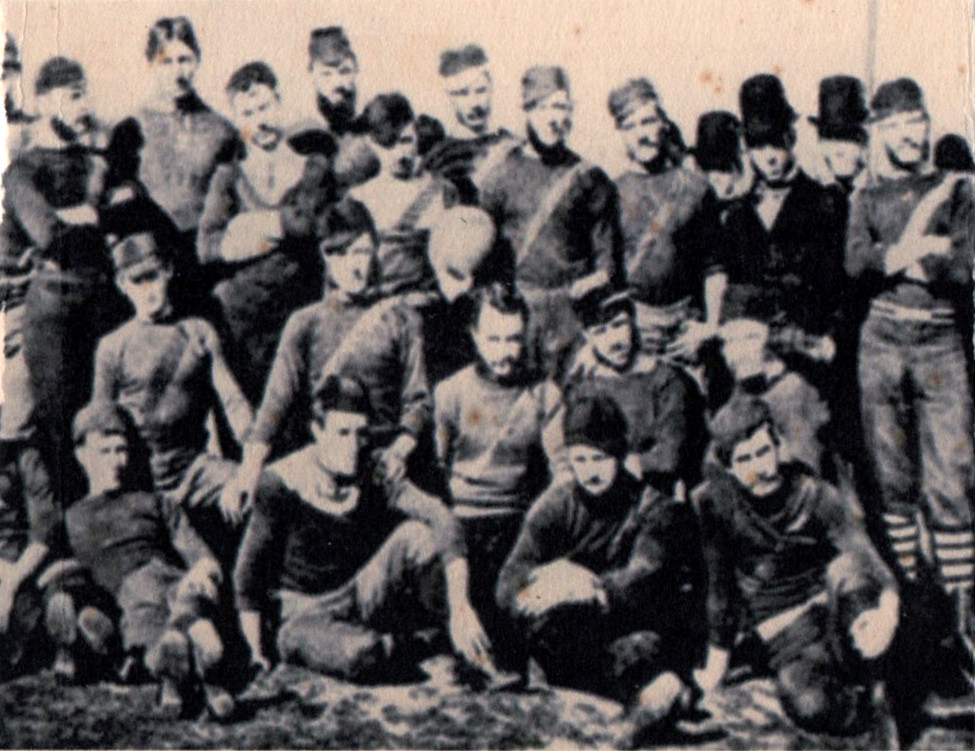
The Black Arabs in February 1884

The club was formed following a meeting at the Eastville Restaurant in Bristol in September 1883. It was initially called Black Arabs F.C., after the Arabs rugby team and the predominantly black kits in which they played. This name only lasted for the 1883–84 season, and in a bid to draw more fans from the local area the club was renamed Eastville Rovers in 1884.

Football: Wotton-under-Edge v Black Arabs (Bristol). A match under association rules has been played at Wotton-under-Edge between these clubs, resulting in the defeat of the visiting team. The home team were in every point superior to their antagonists and after a one-sided game Wotton were declared victors by six goals to nil.

— Dursley Gazette, 3 December 1883, reproduced in Byrne & Jay (2003). A report of the Black Arabs' first match.

=== Into the Football League ===
For the 1920–21 season, the Southern League teams were moved into the new Division Three of the Football League, which became Division Three (South) the following season. They remained in this division for over 30 years, before winning the league, and promotion in the 1952–53 season.

Chart of yearly table positions in the Football League

The team has won promotion on six other occasions: in 1973–74 from the Third Division to the Second Division, again in 1989–90 as Division Three champions, in 2006–07 to the Football League One, in 2014–15 to League Two from the Conference Premier, in 2015–16 to League One and then in 2021-22 to League One from League Two. The club has been relegated eight times—in 1961–62, 1980–81, 1992–93, 2000–01, 2010–11, 2013–14, 2020–21 and most recently at the end of the 2024–25 season.

The highest position in the football ladder reached by Rovers at the end of season is sixth place in the second tier, which they achieved twice; once in 1955–56, and again in 1958–59. The closest they came to the top flight was in 1955–56, when they ended the season just four points below the promotion positions. The lowest league position achieved by the club is twenty-third out of twenty-four teams in the fourth tier, which has occurred twice. In the 2001–02 season, relegation from the Football League was narrowly avoided on two counts; firstly they ended just one league position above the relegation zone, and secondly the rules were changed the following season to increase the number of relegation places to two, meaning that if Rovers had finished in that position one year later they would have been relegated. This position was matched at the end of the 2013–14 season, which this time saw Rovers relegated to the Conference for the first time. They returned to the league at the end of their first Conference season, with a penalty shootout victory over Grimsby Town in the play-off final. In February 2016, it was announced that a 92% stake in the club had been bought by the Jordanian al-Qadi family, and that Wael al-Qadi, a member of the Jordan Football Association, would become the president. Since 2016, the club has been owned by Dwane Sports Ltd, with 92.6% of the shares, while Bristol Rovers Supporters Club owns the remaining 7.4%.

In May 2016, the club recorded a second consecutive promotion by finishing in the final automatic promotion position in League Two after a 92nd-minute goal secured victory over Dagenham and Redbridge and Accrington Stanley failed to win on the final day of the season. It marked the first time Rovers had reached the third tier of English Football since relegation in 2011. In June 2020, it was announced that president Wael al-Qadi had bought a controlling stake in Dwane Sports Ltd, after he bought the shares of other members of his family, while it was also announced that the club's debt would be capitalised and a new training facility would begin construction at Hortham Lane, Almondsbury, which is close to the M5 motorway. Rovers have owned the site formerly known as 'The Colony' and re-branded by the club 'The Quarters' since 2017, and, in June 2020, the club announced that it would be ready for the beginning of the 2020–21 season.

On 3 August 2023, Kuwaiti businessman Hussain AlSaeed bought a controlling 55% share in Dwane Sports, the holding company for the football club, thus becoming chairman. As part of the takeover, all debt owed to the company was capitalised. On 22 November 2024, AlSaeed reached an agreement to purchase the remaining 45% of shares owned by both Wael and Samer al-Qadi, the acquisition to be completed over an eighteen-month period.

== Cup competitions ==
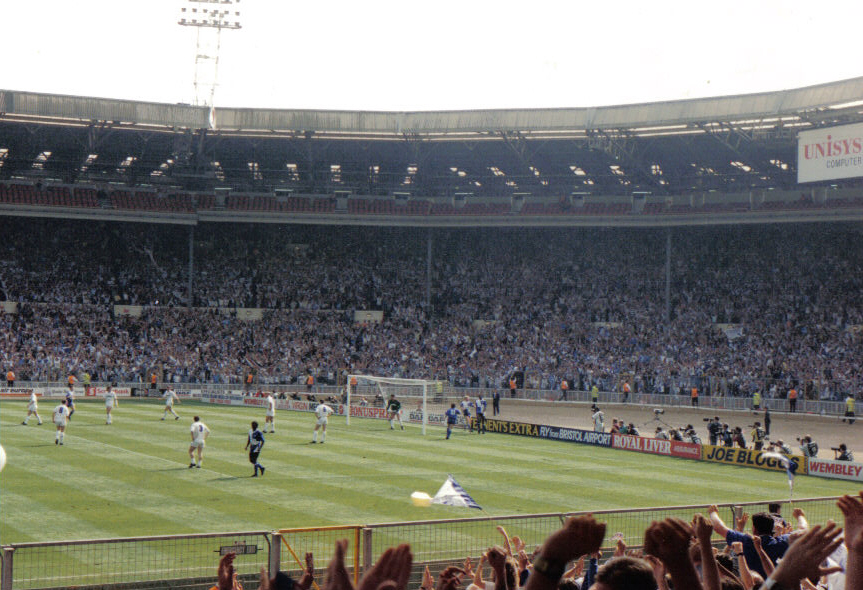
Bristol Rovers playing against Tranmere Rovers at Wembley in 1990

The only major cup competition won by Bristol Rovers is the 1972 Watney Cup, when they beat Sheffield United in the final. The club also won the Division Three (South) Cup in 1934–35, as well as winning or sharing the Gloucestershire Cup on 32 occasions. The team has never played in European competition; the closest Rovers came was when they missed out on reaching the international stage of the Anglo-Italian Cup in the 1992–93 season on a coin toss held over the phone with West Ham United.

In the FA Cup, Rovers have reached the quarter-final stage on three occasions. The first time was in 1950–51 when they faced Newcastle United at St James' Park in front of a crowd of 62,787, the record for the highest attendance at any Bristol Rovers match. The second time they reached the quarter final was in 1957–58, when they lost to Fulham, and the most recent appearance at this stage of the competition was during the 2007–08 season, when they faced West Bromwich Albion. They were the first Division Three team to win an FA Cup tie away to a Premier League side, when in 2002 they beat Derby County 3–1 at Pride Park Stadium.

They have twice reached the final of the Football League Trophy, in 1989–90 and 2006–07, but finished runners-up on both occasions. On the second occasion they did not allow a single goal against them in the competition en route to the final, but conceded the lead less than a minute after the final kicked off.

== Rivalries ==
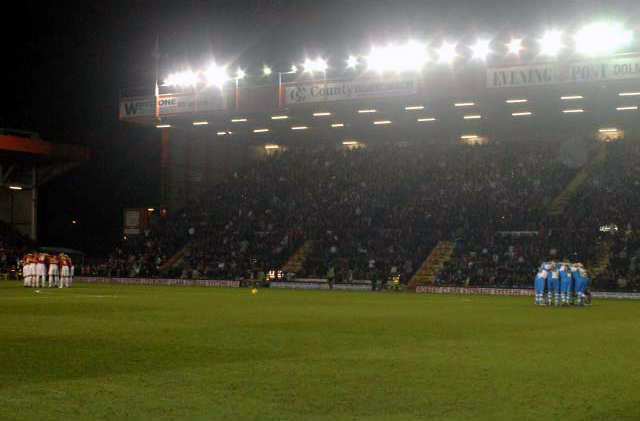
Bristol Rovers (blue) against Bristol City (red) in a Football League Trophy match at Ashton Gate in February 2007

Bristol Rovers's main rivals are city neighbours Bristol City, with whom they contest the Bristol derby. An in-depth report by the Football Pools in 2008 deemed this rivalry 8th fiercest rivalry in English football. The most recent encounter between the clubs as of March 2025 took place on 4 September 2013, which saw Rovers beaten by City in a Football League Trophy tie at Ashton Gate Stadium by a 2–1 scoreline. Other rivals are Newport County and mainly teams from the West Country, such as Swindon Town, Cheltenham Town, Yeovil Town and Forest Green Rovers.

In the past, rivalries also emerged with Severnside rivals Cardiff City known as the Severnside derby. Rovers' most recent meeting against Cardiff was an EFL Cup defeat in August 2024. The last time Cardiff and Bristol Rovers were in the same league was in the 1999–2000 season in the Second Division.

The first time Rovers encountered Yeovil was a Football League Trophy match in October 2001, which Rovers won via a penalty shoot-out. The most recent encounter between the teams was in the EFL Trophy in October 2018, which Rovers won 2–0.

As of April 2026, Rovers last played Swindon Town in a 1–1 draw at the County Ground on 28 February 2026. They last played Cheltenham Town in a 4–0 win at the Memorial Stadium on 25 April 2026.

== Colours and badge ==
Team colours from 1883 to 1885

Bristol Rovers are known for their distinctive blue and white quartered shirts which they have worn for most of their history. The current home kit consists of a blue and white quartered shirt and blue shorts, the away kit is all black, while the third kit is a green and black quartered shirt and black shorts. During the 2008–09 season, a special third strip, which was black with a gold sash, and a reproduction of the original Black Arab shirt, was used for a single match to celebrate the club's 125th anniversary. The club released a similar kit marking the 140th anniversary which players wore in a match against Cheltenham Town in December 2023.

Team colours on winning the Southern League in 1905

The team began playing in black shirts with a yellow sash from their foundation in 1883 as Black Arabs F.C. until 1885, by which time they were called Eastville Rovers. For the next fourteen years, until 1899, the team wore blue and white hooped shirts. These were replaced by black and white striped shirts until 1919.

When Rovers were admitted to The Football League in 1920 they wore white shirts with blue shorts. These remained the team colours until 1930, when the colours were reversed to blue shirts and white shorts for one season. The blue and white quarters were first worn in 1931, when they were introduced to try to make the players look larger and more intimidating. Rovers continued to wear the quarters for 31 years, until they were replaced by blue pinstripes on a white background.

1996–97 "Tesco" shirts

Over the next ten years, Rovers went on to wear blue and white stripes, all blue, and blue shirts with white shorts before returning to the blue and white quarters in 1973, which have remained the colours ever since. During the 1996–97 season, Rovers wore an unpopular striped quartered design, prompting fans to refer to it as the Tesco bag shirts. The change in design prompted the Trumpton Times fanzine to change its name to Wot, No Quarters?

The black and gold shirts were also used as the away kit for the 2002–03 season, the club's 120th anniversary.

In 2005, Rovers ran an April Fools' joke on their official website, stating that the team's new away strip would be all pink. Although this was intended to be a joke, a number of fans petitioned the club to get the kit made for real, and also suggested that funds raised through the sale of the pink shirts should be donated to a breast cancer charity. Although the pink shirts were never used in a competitive fixture, they were worn for a pre-season friendly against Plymouth Argyle in 2006.

A pirate features on both the club badge and the badge of the supporters club, reflecting the club nickname of The Pirates. Previous club badges have featured a blue and white quartered design, based on the quartered design of the team's jerseys.

=== Kit suppliers and sponsors ===
Rovers first used Bukta as an official kit supplier in 1977, and Great Mills as the first kit sponsor followed 1981. Rovers' longest running kit supplier is Errea who supplied the club kits for eleven years (2005–16). The club's longest running kit sponsorship was from local company Cowlin Construction, who sponsored the club for 11 years before ending the deal in 2009. Following the end of the Cowlin deal, sponsors were chosen by raffle, via the 1883 Club. This process lasted nine seasons before the club announced Football INDEX as new sponsors for both home and away kits. In 2019, Utilita become the main shirt sponsors of both the home and away kits for the 2019-2020 season, and the deal was then extended in July 2020 to cover the 2020-2021 season, marking the first time a shirt sponsor had lasted for more than one season since the end of the Cowlin sponsorship in 2009.

Period	Kit supplier	Home Kit Sponsor	Away Kit Sponsor
1977–1981	Bukta	No sponsor	
1981–1983	Bukta	Great Mills	
1983–1984	Bukta	Toshiba	
1984–1986	Hobott	Toshiba	
1986–1987	Henson	Peter Carol	
1987–1988	Henson	Design Windows	
1988–1990	Spall	Design Windows	Universal Components
1990–1992	Spall	Design Windows	
1992–1993	Spall	Roman Glass	
1993–1995	Matchwinner	Roman Glass	
1995–1996	Le Coq Sportif	Elite Hampers	
1996–1997	Cica	Bradshaw's Snack Box	
1997–1998	Cica	The Jelf Group	
1998–1999	Cica	Cowlin Construction	
1999–2001	Avec	Cowlin Construction	
2001–2005	Strikeforce	Cowlin Construction	
2005–2009	Errea	Cowlin Construction	
2009–2010	Errea	N-Gaged	Stevens, Hewlett & Perkins
2010–2011	Errea	Smart Computers	Stalbridge Linen
2011–2012	Errea	McCarthy Waste	ITS
2012–2013	Errea	Opus Recruitment Solutions	CR Windows
2013–2014	Errea	Eurocams	Highspec Travel Services
2014–2015	Errea	Arco	Office Beverages
2015–2016	Errea	The Sportsman Pub	Pensord Press
2016–2017	Macron	Dribuild	Powersystems UK Ltd
2017–2018	Macron	Thorntons Travel	Barrs Court Construction
2018–2019	Macron	Football INDEX	
2019–2024	Macron	Utilita Energy	
2024–2026	Macron	FanHub	
2026–present	Puma	Hotchkins Group	

== Stadium ==
=== Grounds ===
- Purdown – 1883–1884
- Three Acres – 1884–1891
- Schoolmasters Cricket Ground – 1891–1892
- Durdham Down – 1892–1894
- Ridgeway – 1894–1897
- Eastville Stadium – 1897–1986
- Twerton Park – 1986–1996
- The Memorial Stadium – 1996–present

=== History ===
Rovers play their home games at the Memorial Stadium in Horfield, a ground they formerly shared with Bristol Rugby. The team moved to The Mem, as it is known informally, at the beginning of the 1996–97 season, initially as tenants but purchased it two years later.

When Bristol Rovers were known as Black Arabs F.C. in 1883, they played their home games at Purdown, Stapleton. The following year they moved to Three Acres, the precise location of which is not known, but is believed to have been in the Ashley Down area of Bristol, where they remained for seven years. This was followed by brief stays at the Schoolmasters Cricket Ground, Durdham Down and Ridgeway.

For the majority of their history, Bristol Rovers have played their home games at the Eastville Stadium, where they remained for a period of 89 years from 1897 to 1986. Financial problems led to the team being forced to leave Eastville, now it is an IKEA Store. Bristol Rovers found a temporary home at Twerton Park, the home of Bath City. They stayed in Bath for 10 years, before returning to Bristol in 1996.

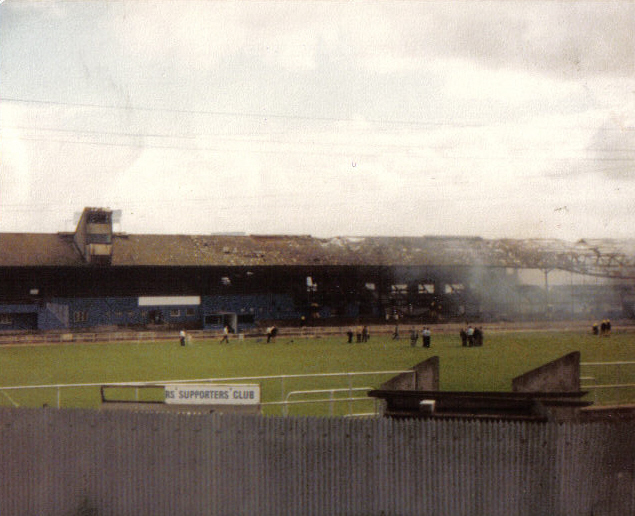
Aftermath of the fire at Eastville Stadium, August 1980

Rovers also played five home games at Ashton Gate Stadium, home of rivals Bristol City, following a fire which destroyed the South Stand of the Eastville Stadium on the night of the 16–17 August 1980. Rovers returned to Eastville in October 1980. During World War II, some friendly matches were played in Kingswood, and in their early history some games were played at Parson Street, Bedminster

In January 2007, planning permission was granted for a new 18,500 capacity all-seater stadium to be built on the site of the Memorial Stadium. The project was abandoned after a series of delays. In June 2011, the club announced its intention to relocate the club to a new 21,700 all-seater stadium on the University of the West of England's Frenchay campus. The planned UWE Stadium was shelved in August 2017 due to disputes between the club and the university.

In 2017, there was a crowd recording at the Memorial Stadium for Early Man, a 2018 Aardaman film.

In June 2020, the club began construction of a new training facility at a site on Hortham Lane, Almondsbury near the M5 motorway. The site is set to include two full size pitches, a goalkeeping area, a gym and a clubhouse building. Having owned the land since 2017, no work had previously been carried out before the club moved into the training ground for the start in October 2020.

On 6 April 2023, the Wholesale Bristol Fruit Market and Conygar Investment Company made overtures to eventually create a new stadium where the market stood at St. Philips Marsh. The football club saw it as a 'move in the right direction' with regards to a new stadium, having been involved in discussions for 2 1/2 years prior. In October 2023, new owner Hussain AlSaeed confirmed that the club's proposed move to the site was off and they would instead be redeveloping the Memorial Stadium.

== Supporter culture ==
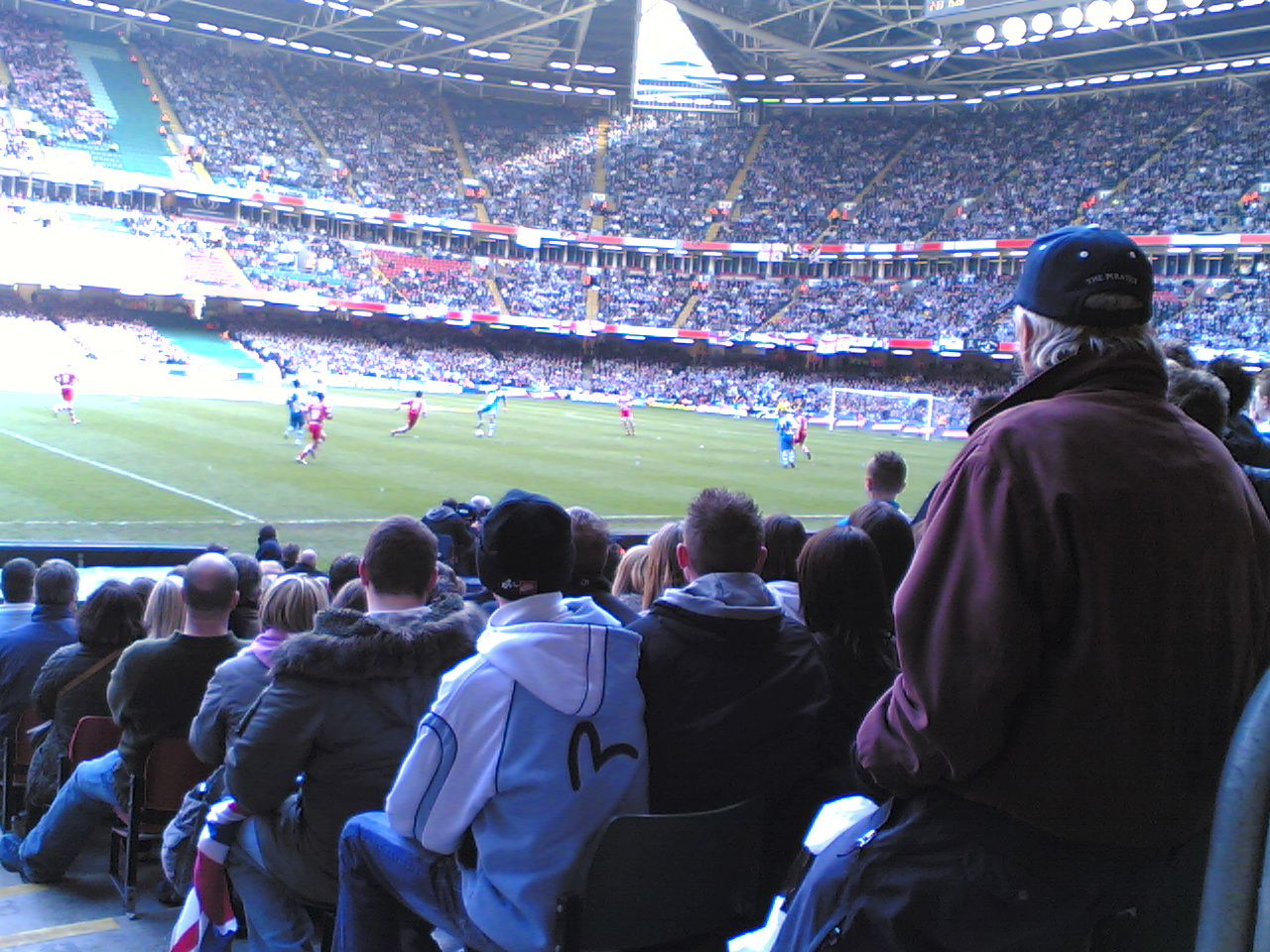
Rovers fans at the Football League Trophy final at the Millennium Stadium, Cardiff in 2007

The team traditionally draws the majority of its support from north and east Bristol and South Gloucestershire. Many towns and villages in the surrounding area are also home to significant pockets of Rovers supporters.

The nickname given to Bristol Rovers supporters is "Gasheads". "The Gas" was originally coined as a derogatory term by the supporters of Bristol Rovers's rivals Bristol City, and was in reference to the large gas works adjacent to the old Bristol Rovers stadium, in Eastville, Bristol which wafted the sometimes overpowering odour of town gas across the crowd. "Gasheads" was adopted as a name by a splinter group of Rovers supporters in the mid-1980s to early 1990s. The chant "Proud to be a Gashead" spread to regular fans, and a fanzine was produced called The Gashead.

The term "Gasheads" is now universally accepted within the English media and football fraternity as referring to Bristol Rovers supporters. After the club's relegation to the Third Division in 2001, the club designated the squad number 12 to the Gasheads, to signify them as the club's 12th Man in recognition of their loyal support.

The retired Conservative MP for Hayes and Harlington Terry Dicks was a Bristol Rovers fan. He mentioned the club in parliament ("now struggling in the second division of the Endsleigh league") on 5 May 1994 when debating with Labour MP and Chelsea fan Tony Banks. Other notable fans are local musicians Roni Size and Geoff Barrow of Portishead and writer David Goldblatt. Former Bristol Rovers player and manager, Ian Holloway, who also managed QPR and Blackpool as well as featuring as a pundit, is still a big fan of the club.

Based on September 2014 statistics released by the Home Office, the Rovers fan base were named the Most Dangerous English Football fan base for the 2013–2014 season, with 57 arrests on the season, of which 35% were for "violent disorder." Particularly dangerous was the scene on 3 May 2014 when the Rovers were assured relegation from the Football League for the first time.

The Rovers fans have good relations with Spanish club CE Sabadell FC, which initially began due to several Rovers fans noticing that the club had the same colours. In July 2016, the clubs played each other in a pre-season match in Spain.

One Bristol Rovers print fanzine is currently active and is entitled Last Saturday Night. There is also a fan-run podcast and blog called GasCast.

=== Club song ===
The song which is synonymous with Rovers is "Goodnight, Irene", which was written by Lead Belly.

Opinions differ as to how this came about, but it is thought to have become popular in the 1950s when a version of the song was in the British charts—the line "sometimes I have a great notion to jump in the river and drown"—seemed to be particularly apt when Rovers lost, as the Bristol Frome flows alongside the old Eastville ground. It is believed that John Clapham is responsible for the song as he used to work at Eastville stadium for the greyhound racing and the last record he would play at the end of the night was "Goodnight Irene" also having a daughter called Irene, the record would then be left in the player and was played at the football. Another theory is that it was sung at a fireworks display at the Stadium the night before a home game against Plymouth Argyle in the 1950s. During the game the following day, Rovers were winning quite comfortably and the few Argyle supporters present began to leave early prompting a chorus of "Goodnight Argyle" from the Rovers supporters—the tune stuck and "Irene" became the club song.

Another popular Bristol Rovers song is "Tote End Boys", which was written and sung by Ben Gunstone. The name derives from the section of Gasheads who stood in the Tote End terrace at Rovers' old home, Eastville Stadium.

== Players ==
As of 9 October 2026

=== Current squad ===
Note: Flags indicate national team as defined under FIFA eligibility rules; some limited exceptions apply. Players may hold more than one non-FIFA nationality.

No.	Pos.	Nation	Player
1	GK	ENG	Brad Young
2	DF	WAL	Tom James
3	DF	ENG	Jack Sparkes
4	DF	NIR	Kofi Balmer
5	DF	ENG	Alfie Kilgour (captain)
6	MF	ENG	Clinton Mola
7	FW	ENG	Shaq Forde
8	MF	ENG	Reiss-Alexander Russell-Denny (on loan from Tottenham Hotspur)
9	FW	IRL	Joe Quigley
10	MF	CMR	Bobby Kamwa
11	FW	SCO	Jack Aitchison
14	DF	ENG	Ben Purrington

No.	Pos.	Nation	Player
17	DF	IRL	Ciarán Kelly
19	FW	WAL	Ellis Harrison
21	MF	ENG	Richie Smallwood
22	MF	ENG	Keenan Gough (on loan from Charlton Athletic)
23	DF	WAL	Macauley Southam-Hales
24	MF	ENG	Tommy Leigh (on loan from Bradford City)
26	DF	ENG	Riley Harbottle
27	FW	ENG	Philip Sanyaolu (on loan from Queens Park Rangers)
28	MF	ENG	Arvin Appiah
29	FW	SUI	Fabrizio Cavegn
32	GK	ENG	Charlie Binns
33	MF	ENG	Ryan De Havilland

==== Development squad and Under-18s ====
Note: Flags indicate national team as defined under FIFA eligibility rules; some limited exceptions apply. Players may hold more than one non-FIFA nationality.

No.	Pos.	Nation	Player
—	GK	NZL	Zane Donaghy
—	GK	ENG	Will Wilson
—	DF	ENG	Sam Ball
—	DF	WAL	Henry De-Long (on loan at Bristol Manor Farm)
—	DF	ENG	Excel Iwhiwhu
—	DF	ENG	Jayden Joynes
—	DF	WAL	Leo Kelleher
—	MF	ENG	Louie Carr
—	MF	ENG	Quincy Dixon
—	MF	ENG	Jay Horgan (on loan at Didcot Town)

No.	Pos.	Nation	Player
—	MF	ENG	Ciaran O'Donnell
—	MF	ENG	Ted Haines
—	MF	ENG	Jacob Hemmings
—	MF	ENG	Deji Odumboni
—	MF	ENG	Jack Toogood
34	FW	ENG	Stan Dunne
—	FW	ENG	Charlie Ball
—	FW	ENG	Woody Cole
—	FW	ENG	Lucas Frisby

==== Out on loan ====
Note: Flags indicate national team as defined under FIFA eligibility rules; some limited exceptions apply. Players may hold more than one non-FIFA nationality.

No.	Pos.	Nation	Player
18	FW	NED	Mees Rijks (on loan at Forest Green Rovers)
20	FW	IRL	Promise Omochere (on loan at Southend United)
25	MF	WAL	Ryan Howley (on loan at Tamworth)
30	FW	WAL	Ollie Dewsbury (on loan at Farnborough)
—	MF	ENG	Kian Hill (on loan at Gloucester City)

=== Notable former players ===
==== Hall of fame ====
The football club launched its official Hall of Fame in 2021 in partnership with Retro Rovers podcast with the purpose of recognising the players and managers who had had the greatest impact. It was announced that ten people would be inducted in the Hall at a rate of one per week in the first half of 2021, with three added per year thereafter. The first inductee was the club's all-time record goalscorer Geoff Bradford.

Bristol Rovers Hall of Fame Inductees
Inductee #	Name	Appearances	Goals	Period	Date inducted	Notes
1	Geoff Bradford	461	242	1949–1964	26 February 2021	Club record goalscorer
2	Stuart Taylor	546	28	1965–1980	5 March 2021	Club record appearance maker
3	Harry Bamford	486	5	1945–1958	12 March 2021	Second most appearances for the club.
4	Alfie Biggs	463	197	1953–1961 & 1962–1968	19 March 2021	Second top scorer in the club's history.
5	Ray Warren	450	28	1936–1956	26 March 2021	Title winning captain in 1952-53.
6	Jack Pitt	499	16	1946–1960	3 April 2021	Spent 50 years at club as player, coach & groundsman
7	George Petherbridge	457	85	1945–1962	9 April 2021	More FA Cup appearances than any other player for the club.
8	Mickey Barrett	129	18	1979–1984	16 April 2021	Talented fan favourite who died from lung cancer in 1984, aged just 24
9	Harold Jarman	452	127	1959–1973 (player); 1979–1980 (manager)	23 April 2021	Third top scorer in the club's history
10	Josser Watling	323	19	1945–1963	30 April 2021	Oldest living former Rovers player. Died on 3 June 2023 at the age of 98.

==== Other notable players ====
This is a list of the other most noted former players at Bristol Rovers Football Club (excluding those listed in the Hall of Fame above) stating the period that each player spent at the club, their nationality and their reason for being listed. To be included in this list a player must have made over 400 league appearances for the club, scored over 100 league goals or hold a club record.

Note: all details from Byrne & Jay (2003), unless otherwise stated

Years	Nation	Player	Achievement	Notes
1928–1932	England	Ronnie Dix	The club's youngest ever player, at 15 years 173 days. The Football League's youngest ever goalscorer, at 15 years 180 days.	
1945–1955	England	Vic Lambden	Scored 117 goals in 268 league appearances.	
1945–1962	England	George Petherbridge	Played 457 league games.	
1953–1962	Kenya	Peter Hooper	Scored 101 goals in 297 league games.	
1956–1973	England	Bobby Jones	Played 421 league games and scored 101 goals.	
1959–1973	England	Harold Jarman	Played 452 league games and scored 127 goals.	
1981–1999	England	Ian Holloway	Named the fans' Cult Hero in a BBC poll.	
1987–1989	England	Nigel Martyn	Became the first goalkeeper to command a million pound transfer fee when he was sold to Crystal Palace.	
1992–2000	England	Andy Tillson	Record signing, and former club captain.	
1997–1999	Jamaica	Barry Hayles	Club record sale when he moved to Fulham for £2,100,000.	
2000–2003	Latvia	Vitālijs Astafjevs	Most internationally capped Bristol Rovers player, with 31 appearances for Latvia while playing with Rovers 158 times.	
2016–2018	England	Byron Moore	Scorer of Rovers' fastest ever league goal (11 seconds) vs AFC Wimbledon	

== Club staff ==
=== Club personnel ===
As of 27 January 2026

Job title	Name
Head coach	Steve Evans
Assistant head coach	Paul Raynor
Goalkeeping coach	James Bittner
Head of Medical and Performance	Gavin Crowe
Club Doctor	John Moore
Sports Therapist	Leighanne Kelly
Director of Football	Ricky Martin
Head of Recruitment	Chris Spendlove
Head Analyst	Liam McCartan
Lead Sports Scientist	Kyler Burns
Strength & Conditioning Coach	Sam Pashen
Academy Manager	Byron Anthony
Youth Development Phase Lead Coach (U13-U16s)	Phil Hicks
Foundation Phase Lead Coach	Jake Sainsbury
Groundsman	Ben Ford
Kit Man	Josh Evans
Assistant Kit Man	Tom Foley

=== Board of directors ===
Position	Name
Chairman	Hussain AlSaeed
President	Wael al-Qadi
Executive Vice-President	Abdullatif AlSaeed
Director	Khaled Alkandari
Director	Abdulaziz Alroomi
Director of Football	Ricky Martin
Director of Commercial & Revenue	Ritchie Bates

=== Managerial history ===
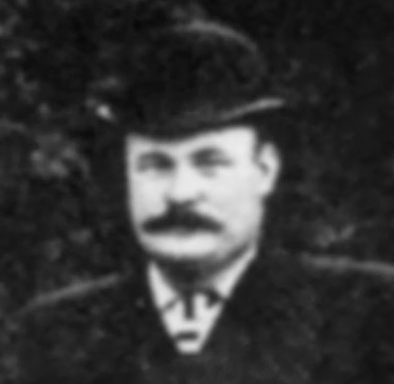
The first manager of Bristol Rovers, Alfred Homer

36 men have been appointed as a manager of Bristol Rovers Football Club, excluding caretaker managers. Bobby Gould, Gerry Francis and John Ward are the only men to have been given the job on a permanent basis twice, although Garry Thompson had a spell as caretaker manager before later being appointed permanently, and Phil Bater was caretaker manager on two occasions.

- (England) Alfred Homer 1899–1920
- (England) Ben Hall 1920–21
- (England) Andrew Wilson 1921–26
- (England) Joe Palmer 1926–29
- (England) David McLean 1929–30
- (England) Albert Prince-Cox 1930–36
- (England) Percy Smith 1936–37
- (England) Brough Fletcher 1938–50
- (England) Bert Tann 1950–68
- (England) Fred Ford 1968–69
- (England) Bill Dodgin Sr. 1969–72
- (England) Don Megson 1972–77
- (Scotland) Bobby Campbell 1977–79
- (England) Harold Jarman 1979–80
- (England) Terry Cooper 1980–81
- (England) Ron Gingell 1981 (caretaker)
- (England) Bobby Gould 1981–83
- (Wales) David Williams 1983–85
- (England) Bobby Gould 1985–87
- (England) Gerry Francis 1987–91
- (England) Martin Dobson
- (England) Dennis Rofe
- (England) Malcolm Allison 1992–93
- (England) Steve Cross 1993 (caretaker)
- (England) John Ward 1993–96
- (England) Ian Holloway 1996–2001 (player-manager 1996–99)
- (England) Garry Thompson 2001 (caretaker)
- (England) Gerry Francis 2001
- (England) Garry Thompson 2001–02
- (England) Phil Bater 2002 (caretaker)
- (England) Ray Graydon 2002–04
- (England) Phil Bater 2004 (caretaker)
- (England) Russell Osman & Kevan Broadhurst 2004 (joint caretakers)
- (England) Ian Atkins 2004–05
- (Wales) Paul Trollope 2005–10
- (Northern Ireland) Darren Patterson 2010–11 (caretaker)
- (England) Dave Penney 2011
- (Scotland) Stuart Campbell 2011 (caretaker)
- (England) Paul Buckle 2011–12
- (England) Shaun North 2012 (caretaker)
- (Scotland) Mark McGhee 2012
- (England) John Ward 2012–14
- (England) Darrell Clarke 2014–18
- (Republic of Ireland) Graham Coughlan 2018–19 (caretaker)
- (Republic of Ireland) Graham Coughlan 2019
- (Republic of Ireland) Joe Dunne 2019 (caretaker)
- (Republic of Ireland) Kevin Maher 2019 (caretaker)
- (England) Ben Garner 2019–20
- (England) Tommy Widdrington 2020 (caretaker)
- (England) Paul Tisdale 2020–21
- (England) Tommy Widdrington 2021 (caretaker)
- (England) Joey Barton 2021–2023
- (England) Andy Mangan 2023 (caretaker)
- (England) Matt Taylor 2023–2024
- (Spain) Iñigo Calderón 2024–2025
- (England) Darrell Clarke 2025
- (Scotland) Steve Evans 2025–present

== Youth Academy ==
The Bristol Rovers Academy currently operates at The City Academy Bristol and Sir Bernard Lovell School. Current first-team squad members Ellis Harrison and Alfie Kilgour graduated from the Academy to earn professional contracts. In May 2021, U16s player Kyrie Pierre signed for Aston Villa for an undisclosed six-figure fee, a record fee received by the Academy for a player.

One former member of the academy is Scott Sinclair, who was signed by Chelsea in 2005 for £200,000, with further payments to the club possible, depending on performance.

Other former Academy players currently contracted to teams in the Premier League or English Football League include Ryan Broom (Cheltenham Town), Bradley Burrowes (Aston Villa), Ollie Clarke (Swindon Town), Matt Macey (Wycombe Wanderers), Kofi Shaw (Brighton & Hove Albion) and Jed Ward (Walsall).

== Women's team ==
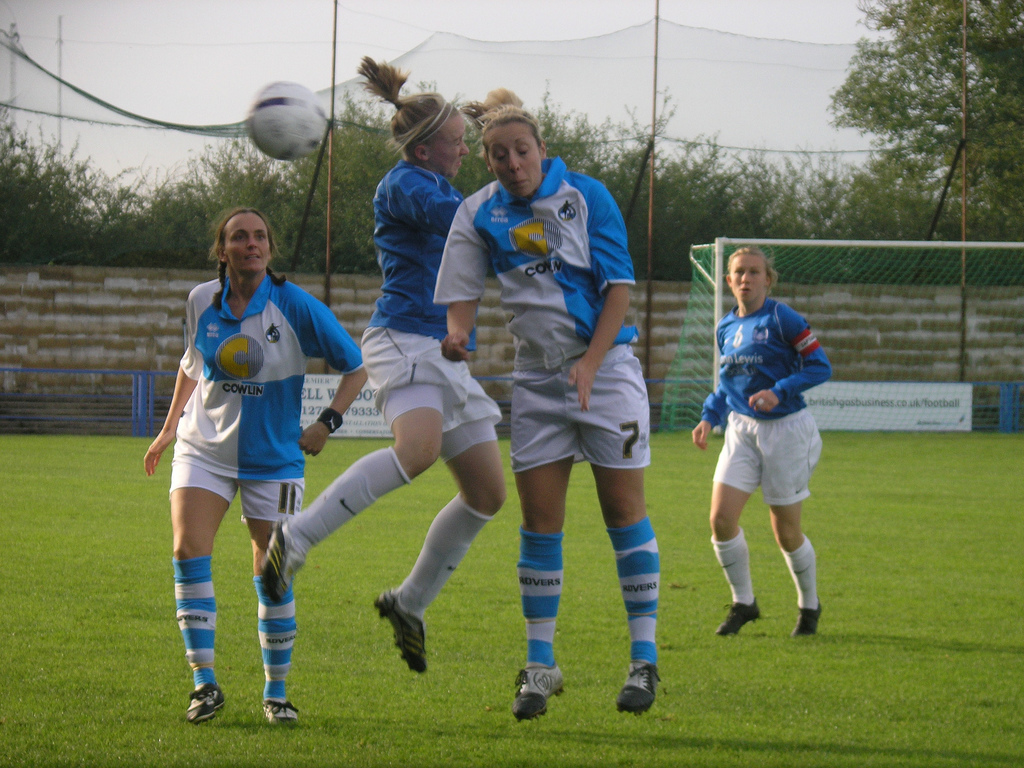
Bristol Academy v Birmingham City, October 2006

The club formerly had a women's team, set up in 1998, as Bristol Rovers W.F.C., following a merger with Cable-Tel L.F.C.. This merger came about as Bristol Rovers only had girls' teams up to the under-16 age group level, so when girls reached the age of 16 they were forced to leave the club. The merger with Cable-Tel meant that Bristol Rovers had a senior squad. The club's name was changed to Bristol Academy W.F.C. in 2005, to reflect the increased investment from the Bristol Academy of Sport. In 2016, Bristol Academy were re-branded as Bristol City following a sponsorship arrangement with Rovers' local rivals.

In 2019, the Bristol Rovers Community Trust relaunched the Women’s team. They began fielding two teams in the Gloucestershire County Women's Football League in the 2019–20 season.

In 2024, the club announced that they would take on the management of the women’s team. After three promotions, the team play in FA Women's National League Division One.

== Records ==
=== Scorelines ===
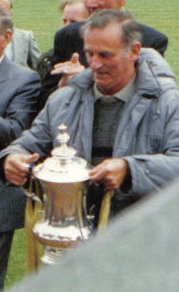
Bristol Rovers record goalscorer, Geoff Bradford. Picture taken in 1988, when he was 61 years old.

- Biggest League Win:
  - 7–0 (v Brighton & Hove Albion, Division Three (South), 29 November 1952)
  - 7–0 (v Swansea City, Division Two, 2 October 1954)
  - 7–0 (v Shrewsbury Town, Division Three, 21 March 1964)
  - 7–0 (v Alfreton Town, Conference Premier, 25 April 2015)
  - 7–0 (v Scunthorpe United, League Two, 7 May 2022)
    - Biggest Cup Win:
  - Competition proper:
    - 6–0 (v Merthyr Tydfil, FA Cup round 1, 14 November 1987)
    - 6–0 (v Darlington, FA Cup round 2, 29 November 2020)
  - Qualifying: 15–1 (v Weymouth, FA Cup Third Qualifying Round, 17 November 1900)
- Biggest League Defeat: 0–12 (v Luton Town, Division Three South, 13 April 1936)

=== Players ===
- Most League Appearances: 546 – Stuart Taylor, 1966–1980
- Most Goals for club: 242 – Geoff Bradford, 1949–1964
- Most Goals in a season: 33 – Geoff Bradford, 1952–53
- Highest Transfer Fee Paid: £500,000 – Promise Omochere from Fleetwood Town 2024
- Highest Transfer Fee Received: £2,600,000 – Barry Hayles to Fulham, November 1998

=== Other ===
- Record Home Attendance: 38,472 (v Preston North End, FA Cup, 30 January 1960)
- Best FA Cup performance: Quarter-finals, 1950–51, 1957–58, 2007–08
- Best League Cup performance: Quarter-finals: 1970–71, 1971–72
- Best League Trophy performance: Runners-up, 1989–90, 2006–07
- Best FA Trophy performance: First round, 2014–15

== Honours ==
Bristol Rovers have won the following honours:

League

- Third Division South / Third Division (level 3)
  - Champions: 1952–53, 1989–90
  - Runners-up: 1973–74
- Fourth Division / League Two (level 4)
  - Promoted: 2015–16, 2021–22
  - Play-off winners: 2007
- Conference Premier (level 5)
  - Play-off winners: 2015
- Southern League
  - Champions: 1904–05
- Western League
  - Champions: 1899–1900
  - Runners-up: 1902–03

Cup

- Associate Members' Cup / Football League Trophy
  - Runners-up: 1989–90, 2006–07
- Third Division South Cup
  - Winners: 1934–35
- Watney Cup
  - Winners: 1972
- Gloucestershire Cup
  - Winners (32): 1888–89, 1902–03, 1904–05, 1913–14, 1924–25, 1927–28, 1934–35, 1935–36, 1937–38, 1947–48, 1948–49, 1950–51, 1953–54, 1954–55, 1955–56, 1958–59, 1962–63, 1963–64, 1964–65, 1965–66, 1967–68, 1973–74, 1974–75, 1981–82, 1982–83, 1983–84, 1984–85, 1988–89, 1989–90, 1992–93, 1993–94, 1994–95

== Sources ==
- Byrne, Stephen; Jay, Mike (2003). Bristol Rovers Football Club – The Definitive History 1883–2003. Stroud: Tempus. ISBN 0-7524-2717-2.
