= Lew (given name) =

Lew is the usual shortened form of Lewis or Llywelyn when they are used as first names in English.

It can also be found in Slavic languages as a translation of Latin name Leon, where it may be written as "Lew" or "Lev".

== People with the name ==
=== Arts ===
- Lew Anderson (1922–2006), American actor and musician
- Lew Ayres (1908–1996), American actor
- Lew Bedell (1919–2000), American music executive and entertainer
- Lew Brown (1893–1958), Russian-American lyricist
- Lew Buford Brown (1861–1944), American editor and poet
- Lew Christensen (1909–1984), American ballet dancer, choreographer, and director
- Lew Cody (1884–1934), American actor
- Lew Davis (1884–1948), American film actor
- Lew DeWitt (1938–1990), American country music singer and composer
- Lew Dietz (1907–1997), American writer
- Lew Dockstader (1856–1924), American singer and comedian
- Lew Douglas (1912–1997), American composer, arranger, and conductor
- Lew Fields (1867–1941), American actor and producer
- Lew Futterman, American record producer
- Lew Gallo (1928–2000), American actor and producer
- Lew Grade (1906–1998), Ukrainian-born English impresario and media mogul
- Lew Harvey (1887–1953), American actor
- Lew Hunter (1935–2023), American screenwriter, author, and educator
- Lew Kelly (1879–1944), American actor
- Lew Jetton (born 1959), American musician and meteorologist
- Lew Johnson (fl. 1866–1890), American minstrel-troupe owner
- Lew Landers (1901–1962), American film and television director
- Lew Lehr (1895–1950), American comedian, writer, and editor
- Lew Leslie (1888–1963), American theater writer and producer
- Lew Lewis, English harmonica player and vocalist
- Lew Meehan (1890–1951), American actor
- Lew McCreary (born 1947), American author, editor, and speaker
- Lew Nottke, American guitarist
- Lew Parker (1910–1972), American actor
- Lew Pollack (1895–1946), American songwriter
- Lew Porter (composer) (1892–1956), American composer and songwriter
- Lew Rywin (born 1945), Russian-born Polish film producer
- Lew Schneider (born 1961), American television producer, writer, actor, and comedian
- Lew Schwartz (1926–2011), American comic book artist
- Lew Soloff (1944–2015), American jazz musician and actor
- Lew Spence (1920–2008), American songwriter
- Lew Stone (1898-1969), English jazz bandleader
- Lew Stringer (born 1959), English comic artist and scriptwriter
- Lew Tabackin (born 1940), American jazz musician
- Lew Temple (born 1967), American actor
- Lew Wallace (1827–1905), American author, lawyer, general, and politician
- Lew Wasserman (1913–2002), American talent agent and studio executive
- Lew Welch (1926–1971), American Beat poet
- Lew Williams (1934–2019), American rockabilly singer and songwriter

=== Politics ===
- Lew Frederick (born 1951), American politician
- Lew Johnstone (1916–1983), Australian politician
- Lew Larson (1911–1977), American politician
- Lew Rockwell (born 1944), American libertarian political commentator
- Lew Sapieha (1557–1633), leader of the Grand Duchy of Lithuania

=== Sports ===
- Lew Alcindor (born 1947), American retired basketball player who adopted the Muslim name Kareem Abdul-Jabbar
- Lew Andreas (1895–1983), American basketball and football coach
- Lew Barnes (born 1962), American football player
- Lew Beck (basketball) (1922–1970), American basketball player
- Lew Beasley (born 1948), American baseball player
- Lew Bradford (1916–1984), English footballer
- Lew Booth (1912–1984), Welsh footballer
- Lew Brown (baseball) (1858–1889), American baseball player
- Lew Burdette (1926–2007), American baseball player
- Lew Camp (1868–1948), American baseball player
- Lew Carpenter (1932–2010), American football player and coach
- Lew Carpenter (baseball) (1913–1979), American baseball player
- Lew Carr (1872–1954), American baseball player
- Lew Chatterley (born 1945), English footballer and coach
- Lew Dodak (born 1946), American politician
- Lew Drill (1877–1969), American baseball player
- Lew Evans (rugby union) (fl. 1881–1904), Australian rugby union player
- Lew Flick (1915–1990), American baseball player
- Lew Fonseca (1899–1989), American baseball player
- Lew Ford (born 1976), American baseball player
- Lew Gerrard (born 1938), New Zealand tennis player
- Lew Graulich (1862–1934), American baseball player
- Lew Groh, (1883–1960), American baseball player
- Lew Hayman (1908–1984), American-born Canadian football coach and executive
- Lew Hitch (1929–2012), American basketball player
- Lew Hoad (1934–1994), Australian tennis player
- Lew Jenkins (1916–1981), American boxer
- Lew Krausse Sr. (1912–1988), American baseball player and scout
- Lew Krausse Jr. (1943–2021), American baseball player
- Lew Lane (1899–1980), American football coach
- Lew Luce (1938–2020), American football player
- Lew Malone (1897–1972), American baseball player
- Lew Massey (1956–2014), American basketball player
- Lew Mayne (1920–2013), American football player
- Lew McCarty (1888–1930), American baseball player
- Lew Meehl (born 1946), American soccer player
- Lew Moren (1883–1966), American baseball player
- Lew Morgan, (1911–1988), Scottish footballer
- Lew Morrison (1948–2023), Canadian ice hockey player
- Lew Nichols III (born 2001), American football player
- Lew Perkins (1945–2023), American athletic director
- Lew Post (1875–1944), American baseball player
- Lew Richie (1883–1936), American baseball player
- Lew Riggs (1910–1975), American baseball player
- Lew Ritter (1875–1952), American baseball player
- Lew Sharpe (1906–2001), Australian rules footballer
- Lew Shaver, American football and wheelchair basketball coach
- Lew Simmons (1838–1911), American baseball manager
- Lew Skinner (1898–1941), American football player
- Lew Tendler (1898–1970), American boxer
- Lew Watts (1922–2003), American baseball player and coach
- Lew Wendell (1892–1953), American baseball player and manager
- Lew Whistler (1868–1959), American baseball player
- Lew Woodroffe (1921–2015), English footballer
- Lew Worsham (1917–1990), American golfer
- Lew Wyld (1905–1974), British track cyclist
- Lew Yates (born 1947), English boxer
- Lew Zivanovic (born 1959), Australian rugby league player

=== Other ===
- Lew Adams (born 1940), British trade unionist
- Lew Allen (1925–2010), United States Air Force general
- Lew Baker (fl. 1825–1856), Welsh-born American policeman and accused assassin
- Lew Campbell (1831–1910), Canadian pioneer rancher
- Lew Cirne (born 1970), Canadian-American technologist and entrepreneur
- Lew Irwin, American journalist
- Lew Kowarski (1907–1979), Russian-born French physicist
- Lew Mander (1939–2020), New Zealand organic chemist
- Lew A. Nelson, American test pilot
- Lew Whiteman (1903–1994), Australian businessman and collector
- Lew Wood (c. 1929–2013), American television journalist

== Fictional characters ==
- Lew Archer, a fictional detective created by Ross Macdonald
- Lew Moxon, a character in the DC Comics Batman series
- Lew Zealand, a Muppet character

== See also ==
- Lew (disambiguation)
- Lev (given name)
