= Lev (given name) =

- Gender: Male
- Language: Slavic

Origin
- Meaning: Lion

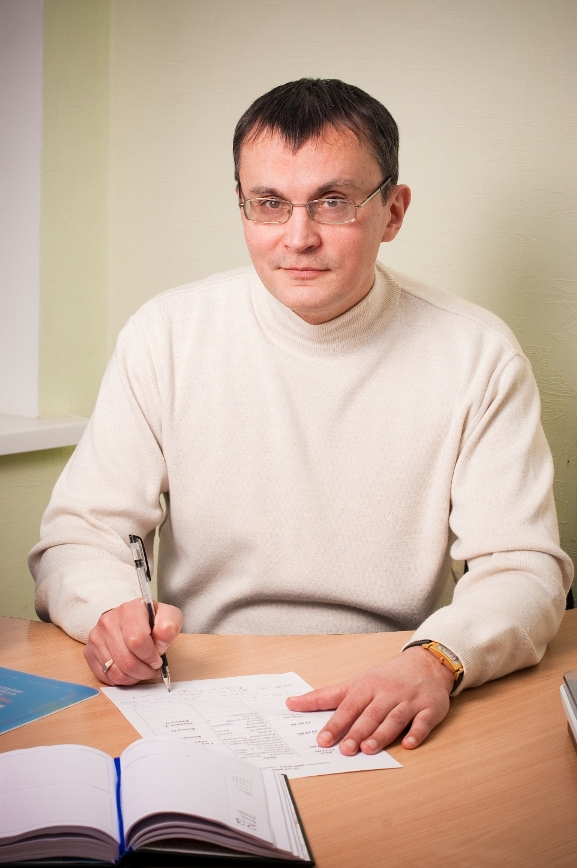
Lev Abramov, president of the Institute of Sociocultural Management, Ukraine

Lev (Russian: Лев) is a traditional Slavic male name meaning "lion," derived from the Latin leo. It is strongly associated with strength, nature, and historic figures, often translated as Leo or Leon in Western languages. The name is also common in Jewish communities and means "heart" in Hebrew and appears as "Leyb" in Yiddish.

Common in Russia. The name was brought to Russia with Christianity and was uncommon up until the 20th century, when it became popular after Lev Tolstoy.

People with this name include:

- Leo I of Galicia (Lev Danylovych in Ukrainian) (c. 1228 – c. 1301), Knyaz (prince) of Belz, Peremyshl, Halych, Grand Prince of Kyiv and King of Galicia-Volhynia.
- Lev Alburt (born 1945), chess Grandmaster and chess writer.
- Lev Artsimovich (1909–1973), Soviet physicist.
- Lev Berg (1876–1950), Soviet geographer, biologist and ichthyologist.
- Lev Brovarskyi (1948–2009), Soviet football player and Ukrainian coach.
- Lev Chernyi (died 1921), Russian individualist anarchist theorist, activist and poet.
- Lev Dengov (born 1984), Russian politician and businessman.
- Lev Dyomin (1926–1988), Soviet cosmonaut and Air Force colonel.
- Lev Grossman (born 1969), American novelist and critic.
- Lev Gumilyov (1912–1992), Soviet historian, ethnologist and anthropologist.
- Lev Hakak (born 1944), Israeli-American academic, novelist and poet.
- Lev Ivanov (1834–1901), Russian ballet dancer, choreographer and Second Balletmaster of the Imperial Ballet.
- Lev Ivanov (football manager) (born 1967), Russian football manager.
- Lev Korchebokov (1907–1971), Soviet football player and manager.
- Lev Kamenev (1883–1936), Bolshevik revolutionary and Soviet politician.
- Lev Kirshner (born 1969), American soccer player and coach.
- Lev Kuleshov (1899–1970), Soviet filmmaker and film theorist.
- Lev Khrshchonovich (1838–1907), chief architect of Kazan.
- Lev Landau (1908–1968), Soviet physicist and Nobel laureate.
- Lev Leshchenko (born 1940), Russian singer.
- Lev Avnerovich Leviev (born 1956), Israeli businessman and philanthropist.
- Lev Binzumovich Leviev (born 1984), Russian-Israeli Internet entrepreneur and investor.
- Lev Loseff (1937–2009), Russian poet, literary critic, essayist and educator.
- Lev Mei (1822–1862), Russian dramatist and poet.
- Lev Naryshkin (1785–1846), Russian general in the Napoleonic Wars.
- Lev Perovski (1792–1856), Russian count, mineralogist and Minister of Internal Affairs under Nicholas I.
- Lev Pitaevskii (1933–2022), Soviet theoretical physicist.
- Lev Polugaevsky (1934–1995), Soviet grandmaster and author.
- Lev Pontryagin (1908–1988), Soviet mathematician.
- Lev Russov (1926–1987), Soviet painter, graphic artist and sculptor.
- Lev Sedov (1906–1938), son of the Russian communist leader Leon Trotsky.
- Lev Shatilo (born 1962), retired javelin thrower from the Soviet Union.
- Lev Shcheglov (1946–2020), Russian physician.
- Lev L. Spiro, American television and film director.
- Lev Termen (1896–1993), often translated as Leon Theremin, Russian inventor.
- Lev Tolstoy (1828–1910), often translated as Leo Tolstoy, Russian author.
- Lev Trotsky (Lev Davidovich Bronshteyn) (1879–1940), often translated as Leon Trotsky, Russian economist and revolutionary.
- Lev Vladimirovich Urusov (1877–1933), Russian prince, diplomat and tennis player.
- Lev Vygotsky (1896–1934), Soviet psychologist.
- Lev Weinstein (1916–2004), Soviet world champion and Olympic bronze medalist in shooting.
- Lev Yashin (1929–1990), Soviet-Russian football goalkeeper.
- Lev Yilmaz (born 1973), American independent filmmaker, artist and publisher.
- Lev Zadov (1893–1938), Ukrainian counter-intelligence agent.

== See also ==
- Liev Schreiber (born 1967), American actor.
- Lew (given name)
- Leo (given name)
- Leon (given name)
