= Ddrum =

Swedish drum manufacturing company

ddrum
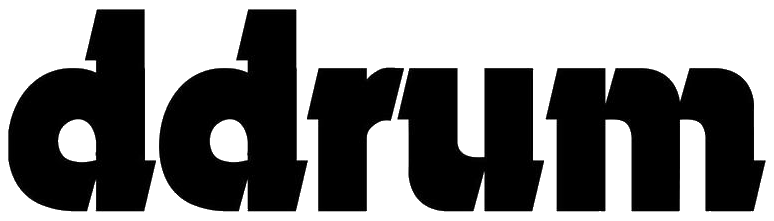
- Type: Private
- Industry: Musical instruments
- Founded: Stockholm, Sweden; 1983; 43 years ago
- Founder: Hans Nordelius and Mikael Carlsson
- Headquarters: Tampa, Florida, United States
- Area served: Global
- Key people: Evan Rubinson - President & CEO
- Products: Acoustic and Electronic drum kits Triggers
- Parent: Armadillo Enterprises, Inc.
- Divisions: Clavia (until 2005)
- Website: ddrum.com

ddrum (/ˈdiːdrʌm/ DEE-drum) is an American-based Swedish company, currently a division of Armadillo Enterprises, Inc. that manufactures acoustic drum sets, electronic drum sets, and Electronic Triggers.

Ddrum was originally a brand of Clavia, makers of the Nord series of keyboards and synthesizers. In 2005, the company was sold to Armadillo Enterprises, which expanded the brand from only electronic drums into a wider range of products.

In June 2026, Ddrum's parents company, Armadillo Enterprises, filed for Chapter 11 bankruptcy protection after facing several years of legal trouble regarding selling infringing guitar designs, with the company being ordered to stop selling V and Z instruments. Armadillo claimed that family disputes ultimately caused the decision to file for bankruptcy.

== Acoustic drums ==
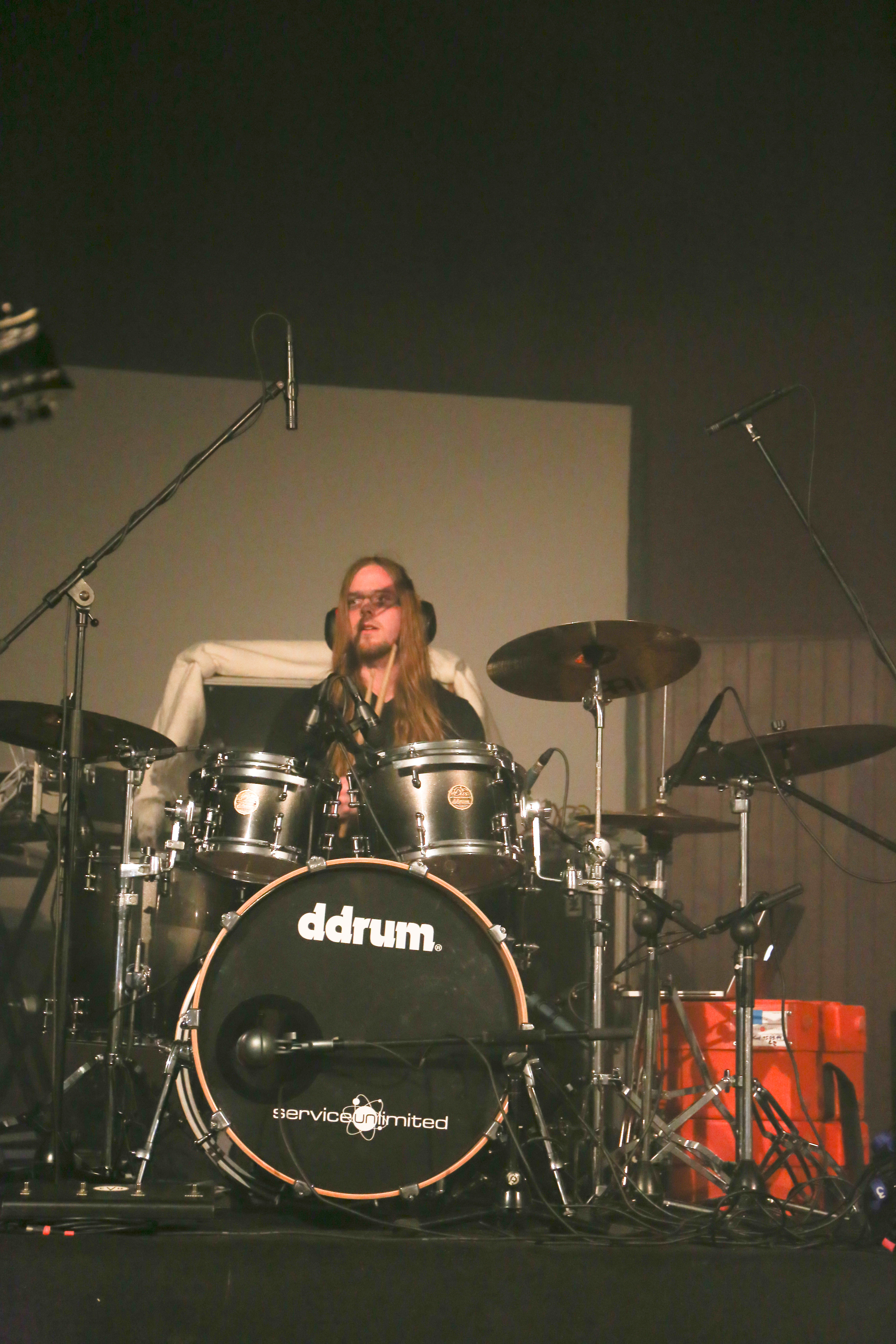
ddrums at the Wave-Gotik-Treffen 2016

Ddrum is a sister company to Dean Guitars and produces drums that fall into one of several series, grouped according to quality and materials used in construction. In addition, ddrum is one of several manufacturers that offers customers the ability to customize their own kit from a number of criteria including shell dimensions, finish, and hardware options in what they call the "USA Custom Shop."

USA Custom Shop - a custom kit with many different options, including a few wood selections.

USA Standard - a less customizable USA drum set option, available in tour tough veneers, die cast hoops and bullet lugs.

MAX - ddrum's high-end import kit. Available in a maple/alder blended wood shell. Bass drums and snares feature 6 inner plies of alder and 2 outer plies of maple. Includes 2 core kit configurations, both featuring 8x12 and 14x16 toms and a choice of either an 18x22 or 14x24 bass drum. There is also a limited edition purple sparkle burst featuring in a 20x22 bass drum as well as 7x10, 8x12, 12x14, 14x16 toms.

Reflex - an industry first, drum shells made from alder, a tone wood long associated with prized vintage guitars and basses. Available in wrapped standard, and painted RSL and ELT series. Also includes the larger sized Powerhouse and Bombardier kits. Alder kits were originally released as a lower cost alternative to traditional maple drums, but were quickly adopted by many of ddrum's top performing artists.

Hybrid - electro/acoustic 6-piece kit. The drums can be used in fully acoustic, fully electric (with mesh heads), or blended Hybrid Drums configuration, allowing for the blending of the two sounds.

Journeyman - Basswood shells available in several configurations.

D2 - entry-level series available in basswood shells.

Electronics - DDBETA lite entry-level E-kit, DDBETA, DDBETA XP, electronic drum kits. Acoustic Pro triggers, Chrome Elite Triggers, Red Shot Triggers.

== Snare drums ==
Vintone Elemental - metal snares in a variety of depth, available in steel, aluminum and nickel-over brass

Vintone Arbor - wood snares in a variety of depths and diameters, available in Maple, Cherry, Mahogany, Walnut, and Alder.

Ddrum also produces deccabons, which are similar in concept to octobans, except that there are ten drums in a full set (hence "decca") as opposed to eight ("octo"). All deccabons are six inches in diameter. They are available with shells made from either clear acrylic or black fiberglass. Drum depths range from 6 inches to 24 inches in 2-inch increments.

Supplies of Ddrum kits outside the USA, particularly to the UK, are sparse with long wait times.

== Notable endorsers ==
=== Acoustic drums ===
- Vinnie Paul Abbott - Pantera, Hellyeah
- Kent Diimmel - In This Moment, 3 By Design
- Daniel Cardoso - Anathema, Sirius, Reset, Storm Legion
- Tim Yeung - Morbid Angel, Vital Remains, All That Remains, Divine Heresy
- Carmine Appice
- Vinny Appice - Kill Devil Hill
- Chad Smith - Mobile Deathcamp
- Simon Collins - Sound of Contact
- Luis "chocs" Campos - Collinz Room, Noelia
- James Kottak - Scorpions
- Rhim - The Birthday Massacre
- Richard Christy - Charred Walls of the Damned
- Robb Reiner - Anvil
- Paul Mazurkiewicz - Cannibal Corpse
- Warner Swopes - Brother O Brother
- JP Stone - Falling Knives, The Royal Space Chimps, Hellcat

=== Electronic triggers/modules ===
- Abe Laboriel Jr. - Paul McCartney, Sting
- Mario Duplantier - Gojira
- Tommy Lee - Mötley Crüe
- Morgan Rose - Sevendust
- Anton Fig - Session drummer
- Mike Wengren - Disturbed
- Dennis Chambers - Santana, John Scofield
- Daniel Erlandsson - Arch Enemy
- Frank Beard - ZZ Top
- Eric Singer - Kiss, Alice Cooper
- Vinnie Paul - Pantera, Damageplan
- Pete Sandoval - Morbid Angel
- John Tempesta - Helmet
- Tim Alexander - Primus
- Kenny Aronoff - session drummer
- David Silveria - Korn
- Joey Jordison - Slipknot, Korn fill-in drummer
- John Blackwell - Prince, Justin Timberlake
