= Lew =

Lew or LEW may refer to:

== People ==
- Lew (given name)
- Lew (surname)

== Places ==
- Lew, Oxfordshire, England
- River Lew, in Devon, England

== Transport ==
- LEW Hennigsdorf, a rail vehicle factory in Hennigsdorf, Germany
- Lew (locomotive), a British narrow gauge railway locomotive built in 1897 for the Lynton and Barnstaple Railway
- Auburn/Lewiston Municipal Airport, by IATA airport code
- Lewisham station, by National Rail station code

== Other uses ==
- An ancient manor now within the parish of Northlew, Devon
- Irene Lew, the main female character in the Ninja Gaiden trilogy

== See also ==
- Lou (disambiguation)
- Loo (disambiguation)
- Lieu (disambiguation)
