= Fishlock =

Fishlock is the surname of the following people:

- Jess Fishlock (born 1987), Welsh football midfielder and coach
- Laurie Fishlock (1907–1986), English cricketer
- Murray Fishlock (born 1973), English football player
- Trevor Fishlock (born 1941), English reporter, author and broadcaster
