= Luis Campos =

Luis Campos may refer to:

- Luis María Campos (1838–1907), Argentine general
- Luis Carlos Campos Villegas (born 1959), Mexican politician
- Luis Campos (racewalker) (born 1962), Salvadoran racewalker
- Luís Campos (football) (born 1964), Portuguese football manager and director
- Luis Campos (musician) (born 1981), Mexican drummer
- Luis Campos (politician) (born 1967), Filipino politician and lawyer
- Luis Henry Campos (born 1995), Peruvian racewalker
- Luis M. Campos, Mexican chemistry professor

== See also ==
- Carlos Luis Campos (born 1980), Venezuelan boxer
- Jorge Luis Campos (born 1990), Paraguayan footballer
