= 1969–70 Newport County A.F.C. season =

Welsh association football club season

Newport County
1969–70 season
- Manager: Bobby Ferguson
- Stadium: Somerton Park
- Fourth Division: 21st (re-elected)
- FA Cup: 3rd round
- League Cup: 1st round
- Welsh Cup: 5th round
- Top goalscorer: League: Mabbutt (14); All: Mabbutt (15)
- Highest home attendance: 7,810 vs Hereford United (FA Cup, 6 Dec 1969)
- Lowest home attendance: 1,009 vs Grimsby Town (25 April 1970)
- Average home league attendance: 2,657
Home colours	Away colours

The 1969–70 season was Newport County's eighth consecutive season in the Football League Fourth Division since relegation at the end of the 1961–62 season and their 42nd overall in the Football League. They finished in the re-election places for the second successive season, but were re-elected.

== Season review ==
=== Results summary ===
Overall								Home						Away					
Pld	W	D	L	GF	GA	GAv	Pts	W	D	L	GF	GA	Pts	W	D	L	GF	GA	Pts
46	13	11	22	53	74	0.716	37	12	3	8	39	24	27	1	8	14	14	50	10

Source: rsssf.com

=== Results by round ===
Round	1	2	3	4	5	6	7	8	9	10	11	12	13	14	15	16	17	18	19	20	21	22	23	24	25	26	27	28	29	30	31	32	33	34	35	36	37	38	39	40	41	42	43	44	45	46
Ground	H	A	H	A	A	H	A	H	H	A	A	H	H	A	A	H	A	H	A	A	H	H	A	A	H	A	H	A	H	A	A	H	A	H	H	A	H	H	A	A	H	H	H	A	A	H
Result	L	L	W	D	D	W	L	D	W	L	D	W	W	L	L	D	L	W	L	D	W	L	L	D	L	L	L	D	L	D	L	W	L	L	W	D	W	L	L	L	D	W	L	W	L	W
Position	20	22	18	16	17	13	17	15	14	13	13	10	8	10	14	14	17	13	15	14	13	14	14	14	17	18	19	20	21	21	22	19	21	21	19	18	19	19	20	21	21	19	20	20	21	21

Updated to match(es) played on 25 Apr 1970. Source:
A = Away; H = Home; W = Win; D = Draw; L = Loss

== Fixtures and results ==
=== Fourth Division ===
Date	Opponents	Venue	Result	Scorers	Attendance
9 Aug 1969	York City	H	1–2	Derrick	4,206
16 Aug 1969	Oldham Athletic	A	0–3		4,585
23 Aug 1969	Exeter City	H	2–0	Hill, Derrick	2,525
25 Aug 1969	Darlington	A	0–0		3,617
30 Aug 1969	Aldershot	A	1–1	Derrick	5,891
6 Sep 1969	Brentford	H	1–0	Derrick	3,203
13 Sep 1969	Chesterfield	A	0–4		4,738
15 Sep 1969	Hartlepool	H	1–1	Thomas	2,950
20 Sep 1969	Southend United	H	4–0	Hill, Thomas, Young, Derrick	2,905
27 Sep 1969	Northampton Town	A	1–4	Cooper	4,665
30 Sep 1969	Grimsby Town	A	1–1	Derrick	3,359
4 Oct 1969	Colchester United	H	4–1	Hill 2, Derrick, Raybould	2,996
6 Oct 1969	Oldham Athletic	H	2–1	Derrick, Mabbutt	4,229
11 Oct 1969	Peterborough United	A	0–4		7,002
18 Oct 1969	Notts County	A	1–4	Ferguson	4,394
25 Oct 1969	Crewe Alexandra	H	0–0		2,947
1 Nov 1969	Port Vale	A	1–3	Smith	7,477
8 Nov 1969	Lincoln City	H	3–1	Mabbutt 2, White	2,377
22 Nov 1969	Wrexham	A	0–3		8,901
25 Nov 1969	Swansea Town	A	1–1	Mabbutt	8,355
29 Nov 1969	Bradford Park Avenue	H	5–1	Mabbutt 2, Radford 2, White	2,722
13 Dec 1969	Chesterfield	H	0–2		2,381
20 Dec 1969	Brentford	A	0–1		4,380
26 Dec 1969	Exeter City	A	1–1	Thomas	6,699
27 Dec 1969	Aldershot	H	3–4	Smith, Mabbott, White	2,200
10 Jan 1970	Southend United	A	2–3	Mabbutt, Hill	4,147
17 Jan 1970	Northampton Town	H	0–2		2,277
31 Jan 1970	Colchester United	A	1–1	OG	4,679
7 Feb 1970	Peterborough United	H	0–1		1,590
21 Feb 1970	Crewe Alexandra	A	1–1	Mabbutt	2,815
25 Feb 1970	Chester	A	0–2		3,664
28 Feb 1970	Notts County	H	1–0	Aizlewood	1,335
4 Mar 1970	Workington	A	0–3		2,000
7 Mar 1970	Wrexham	H	1–2	Ferguson	2,407
9 Mar 1970	Scunthorpe United	H	3–0	Hill, White, Mabbutt	1,917
13 Mar 1970	Bradford Park Avenue	A	1–1	Mabbutt	1,864
16 Mar 1970	Chester	H	3–1	Mabbutt, Jones, Hill	2,638
21 Mar 1970	Workington	H	0–1		2,956
27 Mar 1970	Lincoln City	A	0–3		6,394
28 Mar 1970	Scunthorpe United	A	0–4		3,805
30 Mar 1970	Port Vale	H	1–1	Wood	2,218
4 Apr 1970	Darlington	H	2–1	Mabbutt, Radford	1,607
6 Apr 1970	Swansea Town	H	1–2	Hill	5,537
13 Apr 1970	Hartlepool	A	1–0	Coldrick	1,473
21 Apr 1970	York City	A	1–2	Hill	1,888
25 Apr 1970	Grimsby Town	H	1–0	Mabbutt	1,009

=== FA Cup ===
Round	Date	Opponents	Venue	Result	Scorers	Attendance
1	15 Nov 1969	Colchester United	H	2–1	White, Thomas	3,800
2	6 Dec 1969	Hereford United	H	2–1	Wood, Thomas	7,810
3	3 Jan 1970	Gillingham	A	0–1		9,000

=== League Cup ===
Round	Date	Opponents	Venue	Result	Scorers	Attendance
1	12 Aug 1969	Swansea Town	H	2–3	Hill, Cooper	3,824

=== Welsh Cup ===
Round	Date	Opponents	Venue	Result	Scorers	Attendance
5	20 Jan 1970	Hereford United	H	2–2	Radford, Mabbutt	2,584
5r	28 Jan 1970	Hereford United	A	1–2	Thomas	5,994

== League table ==
Pos	Team	Pld	W	D	L	GF	GA	GAv	Pts	Promotion or relegation
19	Oldham Athletic	46	13	13	20	60	65	0.923	39	
20	Workington	46	12	14	20	46	64	0.719	38	
21	Newport County	46	13	11	22	53	74	0.716	37	Re-elected
22	Darlington	46	13	10	23	53	73	0.726	36	Re-elected
23	Hartlepool	46	10	10	26	42	82	0.512	30	Re-elected

Source: rsssf.com

=== Election ===
Votes	Club	Fate
47	Darlington	Re-elected to the League
42	Hartlepool	Re-elected to the League
31	Cambridge United	Elected to the League
31	Newport County	Re-elected to the League
18	Wigan Athletic	Not elected to the League
17	Bradford Park Avenue	Not re-elected to the League
2	Cambridge City	Not elected to the League
1	Bedford Town	Not elected to the League
1	Hereford United	Not elected to the League
1	Morecambe	Not elected to the League
1	Romford	Not elected to the League
1	Yeovil Town	Not elected to the League
0	Boston United	Not elected to the League
0	Chelmsford City	Not elected to the League
0	Hillingdon Borough	Not elected to the League
0	Telford United	Not elected to the League
0	Wimbledon	Not elected to the League
