= Ray Pulis =

Welsh footballer

Personal information
- Full name: Raymond Pulis
- Date of birth: 21 November 1964 (age 61)
- Place of birth: Pill, Newport, Wales
- Position: Forward

Senior career*
| Years | Team | Apps | (Gls) |
| 1982–1983 | Newport County | 1 | (0) |
- Trowbridge Town
- * Club domestic league appearances and goals

Raymond Pulis (born 21 November 1964) is a former footballer, who played in the English Football League for Newport County where he made one Football League appearance. He later joined Trowbridge Town. His brother Tony is also a former professional footballer and later went into management.

== Career ==
Born in Pill, Newport, Monmouthshire, Pulis made his debut as an 18-year-old in the 3rd Division for his local side Newport County against Plymouth Argyle in the 1982–83 season, laying on the final goal late in the game in a 4–2 win. He then played in a Football League Group Cup match at Chester City, being injured late in the game. He made several appearances that season for the Wales Youth team under manager Mike England. He left the club the following season following a dispute in which the club were told to reinstate his contract, but he instead joined non-league Trowbridge Town.

He rejoined the reformed Newport club in January 1993, scoring four goals in 34 appearances.

Pulis is currently chairman of Pill AFC.

He is the brother of former player turned manager Tony Pulis and his nephew Anthony is a retired professional footballer who currently serves as an assistant coach for the Major League Soccer side Inter Miami CF.
