= David Pyle =

English footballer

Personal information
- Full name: Walter David Pyle
- Date of birth: 12 December 1936
- Place of birth: Trowbridge, England
- Date of death: 8 February 2002 (aged 65)
- Place of death: Trowbridge, England
- Height: 6 ft 0 in (1.83 m)
- Position: Centre half

Youth career
- ????–1954: Trowbridge Colts

Senior career*
Years	Team	Apps	(Gls)
1954–1955	Trowbridge Town		
1955–1962	Bristol Rovers	139	(0)
1962–1963	Bristol City	8	(0)
1963–1965	Westbury United		
Total		147	(0)

Managerial career
- 1964–1965: Westbury United
- * Club domestic league appearances and goals

Walter David Pyle (12 December 1936 – 8 February 2002) was a professional footballer who played as a centre half in The Football League for Bristol Rovers and Bristol City between 1955 and 1963.

Born in Trowbridge, Pyle started his career playing in his home town for Trowbridge Colts, before graduating to senior side Trowbridge Town in 1954. After a year playing non-League football for them he signed his first professional contract in 1955 when he joined Bristol Rovers. He played 139 League games for Rovers in seven years, but when they were relegated to the Football League Third Division in 1962 he crossed the city to join Bristol City. During his single season with City he played eight games in the Football League, but returned to non-League football at the end of the campaign when he joined Westbury United.

After a year playing for Westbury United he was appointed as their manager, and he remained in the position for two years. Away from football Pyle was landlord of a series of public houses. While playing in Bristol he ran the Pelican in Old Market, before returning to his home county of Wiltshire and running the Horse and Groom in Westbury and then the Kings Arms in Hilperton.

== Sources ==
- Jay, Mike; Byrne, Stephen (1994). Pirates in Profile: A Who's Who of Bristol Rovers Players. Bristol: Potten, Baber & Murray. pp. 214–215. ISBN 0-9524835-0-5.
- Byrne, Stephen; Jay, Mike (2003). Bristol Rovers Football Club - The Definitive History 1883-2003. Stroud: Tempus. p. 504. ISBN 0-7524-2717-2.
