= Trowbridge Town F.C. =

Association football club in England

Coordinates: 51°18′05.51″N 2°12′38.09″W

Trowbridge Town
- Full name: Trowbridge Town Football Club
- Nicknames: The Bees, The Trow, Bridge, Town
- Founded: 1880 (Reformed in 1999)
- Ground: The Town & Country Estates Ground, Woodmarsh, Trowbridge
- Capacity: 2000 (73 seated)
- Chairman: Andrew Meaden
- Manager: James Goddard-Wellon & Karl Freeman
- League: Wiltshire League Premier Division
- 2025–26: Wiltshire League Premier Division, 10th of 17
- Website: trowbridgetownfootballclub.co.uk
Home colours

Trowbridge Town Football Club is a football club based in Trowbridge, Wiltshire, England. They compete at Step 7 in the Wiltshire League Premier Division and play at Woodmarsh, on the southern edge of the town.

== History ==
A Trowbridge Town team was originally formed in 1880 and became one of the founding members of the Bristol & District League in 1892, finishing as runners-up in the league's first season. They stayed in the Bristol league for three seasons and then joined the Western League where they stayed until 1958 apart from two occasions; firstly between 1898 and 1901 when they resigned from the league, secondly 1907–1913 when they joined the Wiltshire County League. After success in the Western League, in 1958 they won promotion to the Southern League. In 1981, Trowbridge won promotion to the Football Conference (then known as the Alliance Premier League) where they played for three seasons before being relegated back to the Southern League where they remained until folding in 1998.

A new team was quickly formed and the Club joined the Wiltshire County League for the 1999–2000 season, where they won the County Intermediate League in their debut season and then joined the County Senior League following improvements to the Woodmarsh Ground. After achieving the Wiltshire League Championship and Wilts Senior Cup double in the 2003–04 season, and conducting further ground improvements, they gained promotion to the Hellenic Football League. At the end of the 2011–12 season the club was relegated from the Hellenic League to the Wiltshire League, as despite finishing bottom of the league, the relegation was voluntary as so that the club could comply with an agreement with the FA and Hellenic League Feeder leagues to relegate a bottom placed club if the facilities did not comply with the grade required.

The team won the Wiltshire Senior League Premier Division in 2004, 2015 and 2023, and have finished strongly in each season they have contested since dropping down from the Hellenic League at the end of the 2011–2012 season.

In 2023, sitting top of the table and unbeaten at home in nearly 2 years, and in all major competitions in 2022/23, the club announced it had applied for promotion to Step 6. The club then won the Wiltshire Senior League Premier Division for the third time in May 2023, with a 2–0 win away at Salisbury FC Development, but were unable to be promoted due to ground grading issues.

In June 2025, the club embarked on an improvement project, in which floodlights and a new pitch-side barrier conforming to Step 5 ground grading have been installed, along with drainage work on the adult and youth pitches. Further plans include a V-mesh fence to secure the inside of the ground, a new toilet/hospitality block, further changing room adjustments to meet Step 5 ground grading, seat installation and more.

== Ground ==
Trowbridge Town play their home games at Woodmarsh, Axe and Cleaver Lane, Trowbridge, Wiltshire, BA14 0SA. Woodmarsh has been the home of the club since 1999. This is known as 'The Town & Country Estates Ground' for sponsorship purposes. Floodlights were installed in June 2025, with the inaugural game played in front of a record attendance of 573 on Wednesday 15th October 2025.

Previously they played at Timbrell Street, the Flower Show Field, the Bythesea Road ground (1923–1934) and Frome Road (1934–1998). The Frome Road ground hosted greyhound racing from 1976 to 1979.

== Honours ==
=== League honours ===
- Southern League Southern Division :
  - Runners-up: 1990–91
- Western League Premier Division :
  - Winners: 1939–40, 1946–47, 1947–48, 1955–56
  - Runners-up: 1921–22, 1948–49, 1956–57
- Western League Division two:
  - Winners: 1927–28, 1929–30, 1938–39
  - Runners-up: 1919–20
- Hellenic League Division One West:
  - Runners-up: 2004–05, 2006–07
- Wiltshire Senior League:
  - Winners: 2003–04, 2015–16, 2022–23
- Wiltshire Intermediate League:
  - Winners: 1999–2000

=== Cup honours ===
- Wiltshire Senior Cup:
  - Winners (8 Times): 1894–95, 1895–96 (shared with Swindon Town),1897–98, 1921–22, 1925–26, 1933–34, 1937–38, 2003–2004
  - Runners-up(9 Times): 1886–87, 1889–90, 1892–93, 1896–97, 1906–07, 1907–08, 1912–13, 1929–30, 2002–03
- Bristol & District League:
  - Runners-up: 1892–93
- Western Football League Cup:
  - Winners: 1956–57
- Wiltshire Professional Shield:
  - Winners: 1945–46, 1946–47, 1949–50, 1968–69, 1969–70, 1972–73
- Western Counties Floodlit League Cup:
  - Winners: 1980–81
- Corsham Print Senior Cup:
  - Runners-up: 2002–03, 2003–04

== Records ==
- Highest League position: 17th in Alliance Premier League 1981–82
- F.A Cup best performance: First round 1945–46, 1947–48, 1957–58, 1963–64
- F.A Trophy best performance: First round 1970–71, 1983–84, 1986–87, 1995–96
- F.A. Vase best performance: Semi-final 1990–91

== Former players ==
1. Players that have played/managed in the football league or any foreign equivalent to this level (i.e. fully professional league).
2. Players with full international caps.
3. Players that have achieved success in other sports or the media
- (England) David Pyle
- (England) Thomas Roberts
- (England) Rex Tilley
- (England) Colin Tavener
- (Wales) Jack Hallam
- (England) Ken Smith
- (England) Bernie Wright
- (England) Jesse Whatley
- (England) Ray Cashley
- (Republic of Ireland) Tony Byrne
- (England) John Smeulders
- (Wales) Lewis Haldane
- (England) Peter Sampson
- (Germany) Alois Eisenträger
- (Wales) Ray Pulis
- (England) Cecil Dixon
- (England) James Vince
- (England) Alfred Gard
- (England) Steve Smith
- (England) Vic Lambden
- (England) Murray Fishlock
- (Republic of Ireland) Miah Dennehy
- (England) Steve Harding
- (England) Pat Godfrey
- (England) Kevin Sheldon
- (England) Billy George
- (England) Lew Bradford
- (England) Ray Mabbutt
- (England) Danny Bartley
- (England) David Moss
- (England) Phil Ferns
- (England) Don Townsend
- (England) Paul Compton
- (England) Bryan Bush
- (England) John Layton
- (Wales) Eric Weaver
- (England) Ray Baverstock
- (Wales) Peter Aitken
- (England) Paul Davies
- (England) Trevor Tainton
- (England) Steve Talboys
- (England) Alan Birchenall
- (England) Richard Thompson
- (England) Roger Smart
- (England) Ken Skeen
- (England) Terry Rose
