= Richard Thompson (footballer, born 1969) =

English footballer

Personal information
- Full name: Richard John Thompson
- Date of birth: 11 April 1969 (age 57)
- Place of birth: Hawkesbury Upton, Gloucestershire, England
- Height: 6 ft 3 in (1.91 m)
- Position: Forward

Senior career*
| Years | Team | Apps | (Gls) |
- Yate Town
| 1987–1988 | Newport County | 33 | (2) |
| 1988–1989 | Torquay United | 35 | (4) |
| 1989 | →Yeovil Town (loan) | 19 | |
| 1989–1990 | Yeovil Town | 17 | (0) |
- Trowbridge Town
- Salisbury City
- Yate Town
- Forest Green Rovers
- Mangotsfield United
- Taunton Town
- Tiverton Town
| ?–2000 | Taunton Town | | |
| 2000–2009 | Yate Town | | |

Managerial career
- 2000–2009: Yate Town
- 2009–2011: Almondsbury Town
- 2012–: Mangotsfield United
- * Club domestic league appearances and goals

Richard John Thompson (born 11 April 1969) is an English former professional footballer. He played professionally for Newport County and Torquay United and has been manager of Yate Town and Almondsbury Town. He is currently manager of Mangotsfield United.

Thompson was on schoolboy forms with Watford and played for Yate Town before joining Newport County in January 1987. He scored on his Newport debut in October 1987, but was transfer-listed shortly afterwards due to Newport's growing financial crisis.

Newport were relegated at the end of the season, and would fold before the end of their first season in the Conference. Thompson left to join Torquay United in June 1988 and made his Torquay debut in the first game of the following season, playing as a substitute for Jim McNichol in the 2–0 defeat at home to Halifax Town. His next appearance came on 25 October 2007, starting in the goalless draw away to Darlington. He started the next four games before losing his place again and appeared only sporadically thereafter. He joined Yeovil Town on loan and moved to Yeovil in August 1989 after being released by Torquay.

Thompson subsequently played for Trowbridge Town, Salisbury City, Yate Town, Forest Green Rovers, Mangotsfield United, Taunton Town and Tiverton Town before returning to Taunton Town with whom he won an FA Vase winners' medal.

In July 2000, Thompson was appointed as manager of Yate Town and has since led the side to two promotions. In May 2007 he was linked with the vacant manager's post at Mangotsfield United, but remained with Yate Town.

Thompson left Yate in 2009 and was next manager at Almondsbury Town. He left Almondsbury however when the club were forced to resign from the Southern League.

In April 2012, Thompson was appointed manager at Mangotsfield United.
