= Alfred Gard =

English footballer

Personal information
- Full name: Alfred Gard
- Date of birth: 1876
- Place of birth: Reading, England
- Date of death: Unknown
- Position: Outside right

Senior career*
Years	Team	Apps	(Gls)
1898–1900	Trowbridge Town		
1900–1901	Small Heath	3	(0)
1901–19??	Maidenhead		
- * Club domestic league appearances and goals

Alfred Gard (1876 – after 1900) was an English professional footballer who played in the Football League for Small Heath.

Gard was born in Reading, Berkshire. He played for Trowbridge Town before joining Small Heath in July 1900 as cover for the injury-prone Billy Bennett. During the 1900–01 season, Bennett was injured rather less than usual, so it was not until 16 February 1901 that Gard eventually made his Second Division debut, in a 3–1 home win against Barnsley. He deputised twice more for Bennett, but moved on to Southern League club Maidenhead at the end of the season.
