= Rex Tilley =

English footballer

Personal information
- Full name: Herbert Rex Tilley
- Date of birth: 16 February 1929
- Place of birth: Swindon, England
- Date of death: 14 May 2016 (aged 87)
- Place of death: Carbis Bay, England
- Position: Wing half

Senior career*
Years	Team	Apps	(Gls)
- Chippenham Town
1953–1958	Plymouth Argyle	123	(0)
1958–1960	Swindon Town	31	(0)
- Trowbridge Town
- * Club domestic league appearances and goals

Herbert Rex Tilley (16 February 1929 – 14 May 2016) was an English footballer who played as a wing half. He made 154 appearances in the Football League for Plymouth Argyle and Swindon Town.

He began his career in non-league football with Chippenham Town before signing professional forms with Plymouth Argyle. He made his debut in March 1953 and was a regular fixture in the team for the next five years. Tilley returned to Wiltshire in 1958 to sign for Swindon Town and stayed for two years before ending his career back in non-league football with Trowbridge Town.
