= Vasil Levski (disambiguation) =

Vasil Levski (1840–1873) is the national hero of Bulgaria, several places were named after him

== Places in Sofia, Bulgaria ==
- Monument to Vasil Levski, Sofia in the centre of Sofia, the capital of Bulgaria
- Vasil Levski Boulevard, major boulevard in the capital of Bulgaria, Sofia
- Vasil Levski National Military University, Bulgaria's national military academy
- Vasil Levski National Stadium, one of Bulgaria's largest sports venues and the country's second largest stadium
- Vasil Levski Stadium Metro Station, station on the Sofia Metro in Bulgaria

== Villages in Bulgaria ==
- Vasil Levski, Silistra Province, a village in Alfatar Municipality, Bulgaria
- Vasil Levski, Targovishte Province, a village in Targovishte Municipality, Bulgaria
- Vasil Levski, Stara Zagora Province, a village in Opan Municipality, Bulgaria
- Vasil Levski, Plovdiv Province, a village in the municipality of Karlovo, Bulgaria

== See also ==
- Levski (disambiguation)
