= Ken Smith (footballer, born 1932) =

English footballer

Personal information
- Full name: Kenneth Smith
- Date of birth: 21 May 1932
- Place of birth: South Shields, County Durham, England
- Date of death: June 2011 (aged 79)
- Place of death: Hertfordshire, England
- Position: Centre forward

Youth career
- Sunderland

Senior career*
| Years | Team | Apps | (Gls) |
| 1950–1953 | Sunderland | 5 | (2) |
| 1953–1954 | Headington United | | |
| 1954–1957 | Blackpool | 6 | (4) |
| 1957–1958 | Shrewsbury Town | 44 | (20) |
| 1958–1959 | Gateshead | 45 | (18) |
| 1959–1960 | Darlington | 24 | (7) |
| 1960–1961 | Carlisle United | 14 | (12) |
| 1961 | Toronto Ukrainians | | |
| 1961 | Toronto Italia | | |
| 1961 | South Shields | | |
| 1961–1962 | Halifax Town | 27 | (6) |
| 1962–19?? | Trowbridge Town | | |
- * Club domestic league appearances and goals

Kenneth Smith (21 May 1932 – June 2011) was an English footballer who played as a centre forward.

Smith played league football between 1952 and 1962 for Sunderland, Blackpool, Shrewsbury Town, Gateshead, Darlington, Carlisle United and Halifax Town. He also played non-league football for Headington United and South Shields. He had spells in Canada in 1961 initially with Toronto Ukrainians in the National Soccer League. Later throughout the 1961 season he played in the Eastern Canada Professional Soccer League with Toronto Italia. After leaving Halifax Town in 1962, Smith joined non-league Trowbridge Town.

== Sources ==
- "allfootballers.com".
- "Post War English & Scottish Football League A - Z Player's Transfer Database".
- "Ken Smith". Barry Hugman's Footballers. Archived from the original on 8 June 2024.
