= Tony Pulis =

Welsh footballer and manager (born 1958)

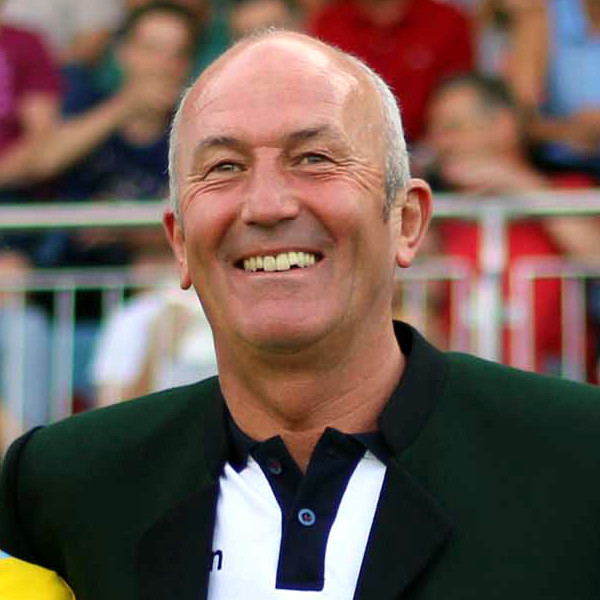
- Pulis in 2014

Personal information
- Full name: Anthony Richard Pulis
- Date of birth: 16 January 1958 (age 68)
- Place of birth: Pillgwenlly, Newport, Wales
- Height: 5 ft 10 in (1.78 m)
- Position: Defender

Youth career
- Newport YMCA
- Bristol Rovers

Senior career*
Years	Team	Apps	(Gls)
1975–1981	Bristol Rovers	85	(3)
1981–1982	Happy Valley	13	(0)
1982–1984	Bristol Rovers	45	(2)
1984–1986	Newport County	77	(0)
1986–1989	AFC Bournemouth	74	(3)
1989–1990	Gillingham	16	(0)
1990–1992	AFC Bournemouth	16	(1)
Total		326	(9)

Managerial career
- 1992–1994: AFC Bournemouth
- 1995–1999: Gillingham
- 1999–2000: Bristol City
- 2000: Portsmouth
- 2002–2005: Stoke City
- 2005–2006: Plymouth Argyle
- 2006–2013: Stoke City
- 2013–2014: Crystal Palace
- 2015–2017: West Bromwich Albion
- 2017–2019: Middlesbrough
- 2020: Sheffield Wednesday
- * Club domestic league appearances and goals

Anthony Richard Pulis (/ˈpjuːlɪs/; born 16 January 1958) is a Welsh former professional football player and manager.

Pulis obtained his FA coaching badge at age 19, followed by his UEFA 'A' licence aged 21 – making him one of the youngest professional players ever to have obtained the qualification. Pulis had a 17-year career as a defender where he played for Bristol Rovers, Newport County, AFC Bournemouth and Gillingham. He also had a short spell in Hong Kong with Happy Valley.

Pulis took his first steps into management at Bournemouth, where he was a player/coach and then Harry Redknapp's assistant. He then took control when Redknapp left the club. He then went on to Gillingham before leaving in 1999 after a dispute with chairman Paul Scally. Pulis then had unsuccessful spells at Bristol City and Portsmouth before being appointed manager of Stoke City in 2002. He guided the club through the 2002–03 season by avoiding relegation to the Second Division on the final day of the season. He spent two more seasons with Stoke before being dismissed by the club's Icelandic board for "failing to exploit the foreign market". He spent the 2005–06 season at Plymouth Argyle before returning to Stoke along with Peter Coates. After narrowly missing out on a play-off spot in the 2006–07 season he guided Stoke to the Premier League in the 2007–08 season by finishing runners-up in the Championship.

With Stoke amongst the favourites for relegation upon their return to the top flight after a 23-year absence, the club finished in 12th position. In the 2010–11 season, Pulis guided Stoke to their first FA Cup final after beating Bolton Wanderers 5–0 in the semi-final. The Potters lost the final 1–0 to Manchester City, but qualified the UEFA Europa League, where they lost 2–0 on aggregate in the round of 32 to Spanish club Valencia. The 2012–13 season saw Stoke make little progress and Pulis left the club by mutual consent at its conclusion.

Pulis returned to management on 23 November 2013 joining Crystal Palace on a two-and-a-half-year contract. He guided Palace away from relegation, to their highest Premier League finish of 11th in 2013–14, which earned him the Premier League Manager of the Season award. He left the club shortly before the start of the subsequent season. He joined West Bromwich Albion in January 2015, a post he held until November 2017. Pulis achieved a top half finish with West Brom in the 2016–17 season, finishing 10th, but the club made a poor start to the following season, culminating in his dismissal. On 26 December 2017, Pulis was appointed manager of Middlesbrough, a post he held until May 2019. On 13 November 2020, Pulis returned to management when he was named manager of Sheffield Wednesday; however, on 28 December, he was dismissed after 10 games in charge. He subsequently announced his retirement from football management.

== Playing career ==
Pulis began his career at Bristol Rovers where he joined their school of football excellence in Eastville from Newport YMCA. Pulis cites his time at Eastville as an excellent grounding with his Rovers teammate and friend Ian Holloway also making it in football management. "We learned our trade at a football club with really, really good people who had old fashioned values, I truly believe that it's because of the way we were brought up back then that we have managed to go on and achieve what we have done in the game. The basic principles were drilled into us, both on and off the pitch. Nothing was given to us and we had to work very, very hard for everything we got."

Pulis made 85 league appearances for the Pirates before leaving to join Hong Kong club Happy Valley AA in 1982. The club finished second in the Hong Kong First Division League and won the Hong Kong Senior Challenge Shield in his eight-month stint with the club. He then returned to Rovers the following year and made a further 45 league appearances before moving to his home town club Newport County in 1984. At Newport, Pulis became a popular member of the squad and his former County teammate David Giles believes Pulis was always destined for top-level management.

With County struggling financially, Harry Redknapp signed Pulis at AFC Bournemouth, spending three years at Dean Court before joining Gillingham in 1989 for £10,000 on a three-year deal. Gillingham manager Damien Richardson had envisaged utilising Pulis as a sweeper but his time in Kent was blighted by an injury suffered in a pre-season friendly against West Ham, limiting him to just 16 appearances. After contemplating a career outside of football and studying for a small business qualification Pulis returned to Bournemouth a year later for a fee of £15,000 to take up a player/coach role. He made 16 appearances, scoring one goal, while in this role.

== Managerial career ==
=== AFC Bournemouth ===
Pulis was promoted to the position of manager in 1992, following Harry Redknapp's decision to leave the club for Premier League side West Ham United. Pulis spent two seasons at Bournemouth, both seasons saw the "Cherries" finish in 17th position before moving on. During his time at the club Pulis spent less than £400,000 on transfers, but recouped nearly £2.7 million in player sales. Among his purchases was Steve Fletcher, signed from Hartlepool United for £30,000, who would go on to make a record 728 appearances for the Dorset side across two spells.

=== Gillingham ===
Pulis then joined Gillingham in the summer of 1995, whom he managed for a further four seasons, turning a team that had struggled at the very bottom of the Football League into a promotion winning one in his first season, and laying the foundations for the club's eventual elevation to the First Division for the first time in their history.

In the 1995–96 season the Kent side gained promotion after finishing second behind Preston North End, setting a record for the fewest goals conceded by a team in the course of a 46-game Football League season in the process, with goalkeeper Jim Stannard keeping 29 clean sheets. The following season Gillingham started poorly, sitting in the relegation places towards the end of 1996, but improved to finish in 11th place and just six points below the promotion play-off places. The 1997–98 season saw further improvement, with the Gills finishing in 8th place and missing out on the play-off places only on the goals-scored rule.

In the 1999 Second Division play-off final, the "Gills" were 2–0 up with less than two minutes left, following goals by the prolific partnership of Robert Taylor and Carl Asaba, only to see Manchester City score twice, the equaliser in injury time, and after that win a penalty shoot-out 3–1. Following the defeat, Pulis was controversially sacked by the club amidst claims of gross misconduct. He later brought a £400,000 court case against Gillingham chairman Paul Scally for unpaid bonuses, which was settled out of court in 2001 for £75,000.

=== Bristol City ===
Pulis was appointed manager of Bristol City in July 1999, prior to the start of the 1999–2000 season. A previous long stint at rivals Bristol Rovers meant that Pulis's appointment was met with mixed reception. He made several reasonably big purchases including Steve Jones and former Rovers player Peter Beadle, but his popularity hit an all-time low only six months into his term as manager and when rumours surfaced of a switch to Portsmouth, home fans chanted for him to leave. He moved on to Portsmouth, where Milan Mandarić had recently taken over as chairman.

=== Portsmouth ===
In January 2000, Pulis left Bristol City to become manager of Portsmouth. He took Portsmouth from the bottom three to mid-table but lasted only ten months in the job before being dismissed and replaced by Steve Claridge in October 2000.

=== Stoke City ===
Pulis was then out of work for two years, before the resignation of Stoke City's manager Steve Cotterill early into the 2002–03 season led to Pulis being given the job that November. Pulis immediately found himself in a relegation battle and it looked likely that the club would be relegated back to the Second Division only a year after being promoted. Pulis, however, completed the signings of striker Ade Akinbiyi and goalkeeper Mark Crossley, on loan from Crystal Palace and Middlesbrough respectively, who helped turn around the club's bad run. Stoke avoided relegation on the final day of the 2002–03 season with a 1–0 win over Reading at the Britannia Stadium, with Akinbiyi scoring the only goal of the match. Pulis rates Stoke's survival in 2002–03 as one of his best achievements in management.

In the following season, 2003–04, Pulis guided the club to an 11th-place finish. Tensions grew between the manager and chairman, Gunnar Gíslason, in the 2004–05 season. Pulis was frustrated with his lack of transfer funds which led to Dave Brammer and Steve Simonsen, both of whom were free agents, being his only significant signings prior to the start of the season. Pulis, however, did add Anthony Pulis, his son, and Lewis Buxton to his squad in January 2005. The disagreement between Pulis and the club's Icelandic ownership culminated with Pulis parting company with the club on 28 June 2005. He was dismissed for "failing to exploit the foreign transfer market" by then chairman Gíslason. Following his dismissal, Pulis bemoaned the club's decision to sell Ade Akinbiyi to Championship rivals Burnley, stating, "We sold our top scorer and never replaced him." Dutch manager Johan Boskamp was named as Pulis's successor on 29 June 2005, a day after Pulis was dismissed.

=== Plymouth Argyle ===
After a brief spell assisting with training sessions at Boston United (then managed by his friend Steve Evans), Pulis was appointed as manager at Championship side Plymouth Argyle in September 2005, managing to turn a floundering team into one that with the right investment could challenge for a top half/play off place in 2006–07. The turn-around coincided with the loan of West Ham United central defender Elliott Ward and the club improved even further with the permanent signing of Lilian Nalis from Sheffield United. Plymouth Argyle ended the season 14th in the Championship table.

=== Return to Stoke City ===
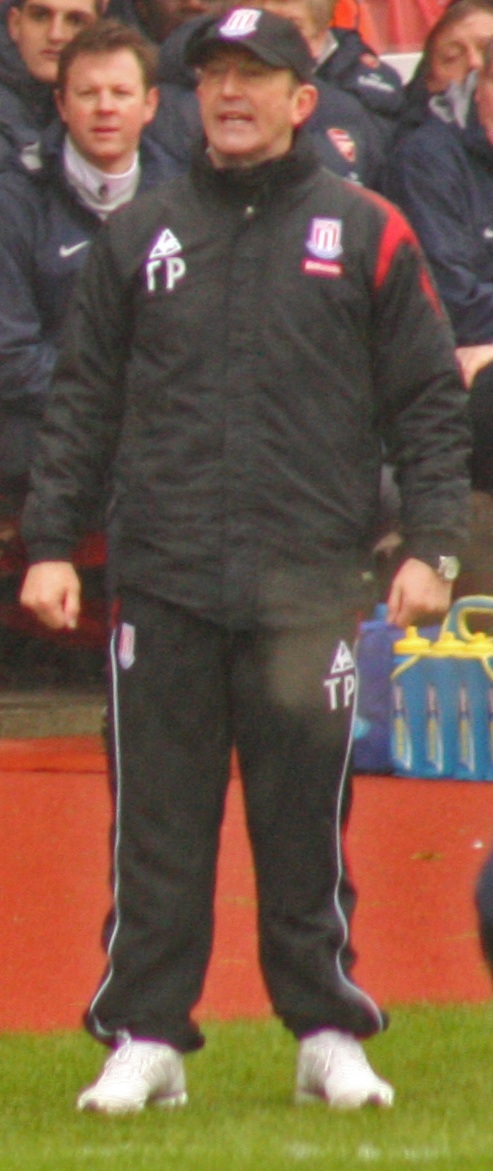
Pulis in typical matchday dress

In May 2006, Pulis was the subject of an approach from former club Stoke, who had recently parted company with manager Johan Boskamp, following Peter Coates's takeover of the club. Plymouth reportedly turned down this approach. On 14 June 2006, however, it was announced that Pulis would be returning as manager of Stoke.

Pulis bolstered his squad for the 2006–07 season with the permanent additions of Danny Higginbotham, Ricardo Fuller and Vincent Péricard. His most notable coup was the loan signing of Lee Hendrie from Aston Villa. Hendrie's arrival along with the loan signings of Salif Diao, Andy Griffin and Rory Delap coincided with a change of form for the Potters following a poor start to the season. Stoke went as high as fourth in the table prior to the January transfer window.

Pulis was named Manager of the Month for April 2007 after Stoke picked up 11 points from 5 league games. This unbeaten run lifted Stoke to seventh in the table, on equal points with sixth-place Southampton. A 1–1 draw against Queens Park Rangers on the final day of the season, however, led to Stoke finishing eighth in the Championship. Pulis sold several key players prior to the 2007–08 season; club captain Danny Higginbotham was one of a number of players to depart, joining Sunderland for £3 million. Pulis, however, utilised the loan market again, signing five players on loan, including Ryan Shawcross from Manchester United, with a few of these loan signings joining on a permanent deal in the January transfer window.

Pulis guided Stoke City to promotion to the Premier League on the final matchday of the season, to be Stoke's first top flight campaign in 23 years. Upon promotion, Pulis admitted the need to strengthen his squad but he also made it clear that the club would not go 'over the top' with spending. Stoke's biggest summer signing was that of striker Dave Kitson, who joined from recently relegated Reading for £5.5 million. Kitson was followed by the captures of Seyi Olofinjana from Wolverhampton Wanderers for £3 million, Abdoulaye Faye from Newcastle United for £2.25 million, Amdy Faye from Charlton Athletic for an undisclosed fee, Andrew Davies joined for £1.2 million from Southampton, defender Ibrahima Sonko signed for an initial £2 million fee from Reading and former Potter Danny Higginbotham rejoined his former club from Sunderland for an undisclosed fee. Pulis was also prepared to move players on, including his son Anthony Pulis and striker Jon Parkin.

After a promising start to the Premier League season, Stoke's mid-season slump left them as one of the favourites for relegation. The January additions of Sheffield United's James Beattie and West Ham winger Matthew Etherington, however, helped rejuvenate their season. Stoke dipped in and out of the relegation zone until March, when a good run of form lifted them above the bottom three. Their 2–1 win away to Hull City on 9 May 2009 secured their Premier League survival. Pulis has received much praise for his work with Stoke on a limited budget, in particular his achievement of keeping them in the Premier League. He was mentioned as a possible candidate for the 2008–09 Premier League Manager of the Year award.

The following season saw Stoke consolidating their Premier League status rather than facing relegation, and also saw them reach the quarter-finals of the FA Cup with victories over York City, Arsenal and Manchester City before losing to Chelsea at Stamford Bridge. Stoke finished 11th in the Premier League with 47 points, a place higher and two points more than last season. Pulis made his 300th appearance as Stoke manager with a 3–0 win over Blackburn Rovers on 6 February 2010. The result was Stoke's largest top-flight win for nearly 24 years after a 4–0 win over Wolverhampton Wanderers in 1984. Following criticism from Fulham player Danny Murphy over the way Pulis sets his team out to play, Pulis decided to release a six-minute statement defending the management staff and club as well as questioning Murphy's agenda.

After a number of controversial refereeing decisions that went against Stoke, Pulis advocated the introduction of a relegation system for referees to stop poor decisions. He became only the third manager in Stoke's history to guide the club to the semi-finals of the FA Cup after a quarter-final victory over West Ham. They then went on to beat Bolton 5–0, making Pulis the first manager to guide Stoke to an FA Cup Final. Stoke, however, lost the final 1–0 to Manchester City, with Yaya Touré scoring the only goal. By reaching the final, Stoke qualified for the 2011–12 UEFA Europa League, after Manchester City confirmed a place in the UEFA Champions League. Club chairman Peter Coates said in May 2011 that Pulis is Stoke's greatest ever manager.

In the Europa League, Stoke were drawn against Croatian giants Hajduk Split, where Stoke won both legs 1–0 to become the first Stoke side to win a two-legged European tie. Pulis signed former England internationals Jonathan Woodgate and Matthew Upson on free transfers to strengthen his centre backs following the departure of Abdoulaye Faye. He took charge of his 800th competitive match in August 2011. On transfer deadline day, Pulis signed Cameron Jerome from Birmingham City as well as Tottenham Hotspur duo Peter Crouch and Wilson Palacios; Crouch, at a fee of £10 million, broke the club's transfer record for the fourth successive season. In the group stages of the Europa League, Stoke were drawn against Beşiktaş, Dynamo Kyiv and Maccabi Tel Aviv, and after a 1–1 draw against Kyiv in December, Stoke qualified for the knock-out stages. Pulis described the achievement as a "milestone" in the club's history. Stoke were handed a glamour tie against Spanish giants Valencia in the round of 32. He reached 400 matches as Stoke manager in January 2012. Stoke lost both legs against Valencia 1–0 and exited the Europa League. In the second leg in Valencia, Stoke took a largely reserve side and named just four substitutes which included academy captain Lucas Dawson. This attracted much criticism of Pulis by supporters but he defended his choice. Stoke finished the 2011–12 season in 14th position.

In the summer of 2012, Pulis was again busy in the transfer market, letting Ricardo Fuller leave bringing in a number of new midfield players. In came American duo Geoff Cameron and Maurice Edu, Scottish pair Jamie Ness and Charlie Adam, Wolverhampton Wanderers winger Michael Kightly, Blackburn's French prospect Steven Nzonzi and former England international striker Michael Owen. Stoke made a steady start to the 2012–13 season despite a tough opening set of fixtures. Pulis has stated that he would like to see out the remainder of his managerial career at Stoke and that he is starting to change his side's style of play. Stoke went on a ten match unbeaten run from 10 November to 29 December, and held one of the best defensive records in Europe.

Stoke, however, made a poor start to 2013 picking up just a point in January and a frustrating transfer window saw just two new arrivals American winger Brek Shea and England goalkeeper Jack Butland. Performances and results remained poor in February and Pulis came under heavy criticism from supporters after an uninspiring home defeat against West Ham. Victories against Queens Park Rangers and Norwich City saw Stoke avoid the threat of relegation and they finished the 2012–13 Premier League season in 13th position. It was a season of little progress at Stoke, and Pulis left the club on 21 May 2013 after a meeting with club chairman Peter Coates. Speaking after his departure, Pulis revealed that he was disappointed by Coates's decision but accepted his reasons. He was replaced by another Welsh manager, Mark Hughes.

=== Crystal Palace ===
On 23 November 2013, Pulis was appointed manager of Crystal Palace on a two-and-a-half-year contract, taking over from Ian Holloway. His first win came on 3 December 2013, a 1–0 home win against West Ham. In the early part of 2014, the team went on a run of five consecutive victories, which included wins over Chelsea, Cardiff City, Aston Villa, Everton and West Ham. This run of form earned Palace safety from relegation and saw Pulis named as Manager of the Month for April 2014. Palace finished the 2013–14 Premier League season in 11th position with 45 points, which saw Pulis named as the Premier League Manager of the Year.

During the summer of 2014, Pulis was hired by the BBC to be a pundit for the 2014 FIFA World Cup in Brazil. When he was not working, he used his spare time watching other games to scout new players and to see different managers at work. Shortly before the start of the subsequent 2014–15 season, however, Pulis left the club "by mutual consent", saying that it was because he was not being backed in the transfer market by the Palace board. In November 2016, Pulis was ordered by a high court judge to pay Crystal Palace £3.7 million for fraudulent misrepresentation in a dispute with Steve Parish over a £2 million "survival" bonus paid to him on his request over two weeks earlier than contractually necessary the day before he announced his departure.

=== West Bromwich Albion ===
On 1 January 2015, Pulis was appointed head coach at West Bromwich Albion. He won his first game in charge 7–0 against Conference Premier side Gateshead in an FA Cup third round match. During the January transfer window, Pulis secured the services of former Manchester United midfielder Darren Fletcher, who Pulis soon promoted to first team captain, with Chris Brunt as deputy. Under Pulis, the "Baggies" went through February unbeaten, keeping three clean sheets in a row in the process. West Brom's form saw Pulis named as the Premier League Manager of the Month for February. West Brom secured victories over Chelsea and Manchester United, and Pulis duly led the team to a 13th-place finish in the Premier League.

For the 2015–16 season, Pulis signed striker Salomón Rondón for a club record fee of £12 million from Zenit Saint Petersburg. Pulis's statement that he wanted Leicester City to win the 2015–16 Premier League and the motivation of his players was credited by The Daily Telegraph with spoiling their rivals Tottenham's celebration party. In the summer of 2016, Pulis was hired by ITV to be a pundit for UEFA Euro 2016 in France. He was used for his knowledge and previous punditry experience to commentate live on Wales. There were other games such as Spain-Turkey where Pulis also commentated live on the match.

Six games into the 2016–17 season, Pulis reached the milestone of 1,000 games as a professional manager which came against his former club, Stoke. At the end of October, Pulis signed a one-year extension to his contract. The extension committed him to the club until the summer of 2018. As the season drew to a close Pulis was part of the six-man shortlist for the Premier League Manager of the Season award, eventually losing out to Chelsea manager Antonio Conte. The club finished in the top half of the table under his guidance, occupying 8th place for much of the season, before a poor run of only two points in their final nine games saw them drop to 10th. On 11 August 2017, Pulis signed a further contract extension which committed him to the club until 2019. Upon signing he said: "I'm delighted to extend my contract because it continues the stability within the Club which is essential for its progress."

Pulis was sacked as West Brom manager on 20 November 2017, after a poor run of results where they had won only four of their last 22 Premier League games, a run stretching back to 2016–17. He left with West Brom occupying 17th place in the table. Throughout his tenure, concerns had been raised by supporters over his perceived "negative" brand of football, and a lack of progress at the club.

=== Middlesbrough ===
On 26 December 2017, Pulis was appointed as manager of Championship club Middlesbrough, replacing the sacked Garry Monk, who left the club ninth in the Championship table, after an indifferent first half to their season. On that same day as his appointment, Pulis was present in the stands to watch Middlesbrough, managed by Academy manager Craig Liddle in the interim period, defeat Bolton Wanderers 2–0 at the Riverside Stadium. Pulis's first match in charge of Middlesbrough ended in a 1–0 home defeat to Aston Villa.

Pulis's first win as Middlesbrough manager came on 1 January 2018, a comeback 3–2 victory at Preston North End. As the season continued, Middlesbrough temporarily began to suffer under the similar results under Pulis that they received under Monk's management, though Pulis turned the team's fortunes around, and they finished fifth, qualifying to the play-offs. However, they were defeated 1–0 by Villa, thus being confirmed as a Championship club for another season, much to the devastation of the club's fans, players and staff.

In Pulis's first full season as Middlesbrough, the team had a relatively strong run of results through to February, including a 3–2 away win against Pulis's previous club West Bromwich Albion. His side went on to maintain a top six position until March, though a run of six consecutive defeats saw them drop out of the top six for the first time that season. Middlesbrough finished the season in 7th and Pulis left the club when the decision was taken to not extend his contract.

=== Sheffield Wednesday ===
On 13 November 2020, Pulis returned to management after over a year out of football, joining Championship club Sheffield Wednesday, the second consecutive appointment for which he had replaced Garry Monk. He brought in Mike Trusson as his assistant manager and Craig Gardner as first-team coach during his first week. His first match in charge ended in a 1–0 defeat against Preston North End after Josh Windass was sent off, after 17 minutes. He got his first point the following game in another away game, a 1–1 draw against Swansea City, with Adam Reach getting the first goal of his reign. After the 2–0 defeat to Nottingham Forest, he broke the record for worst start for any manager at Sheffield Wednesday, obtaining 3 points from a possible 24. He won his first game as manager at the ninth time of asking against Coventry City in a 1–0 win, with Tom Lees scoring the winning goal.

On 28 December 2020, Pulis was dismissed as Wednesday manager after having secured just one victory from ten league games. Sky Sports reported that major disagreements between Pulis and club owner Dejphon Chansiri over transfer plans for the upcoming January transfer window were the main cause of Pulis's dismissal. Chansiri later described his appointment of Pulis as a "mistake".

== Style of management ==
"It's simple. If I own an English club, which I don't and which I'd never do, I'd sign Tony Pulis. It's as simple as that. It's a guarantee to achieve what the club wants.

He never managed a club that wants to be champions. He never managed a club that wants a top four place. He's always managed clubs who want to survive and who want stability, and he's mathematic: what the club wants, he gives.

His record is absolutely amazing, and he does what some people don't understand -- but I do -- and what other people sometimes don't rate, but I do. Which is the relation between what the manager wants and what the team is.

Tony's teams are exactly what he wants, exactly what he prepares a team to be. This is the most difficult thing in football. Philosophy is a beautiful thing but football is more than that. Tony is a great example of that."

— José Mourinho on Pulis in May 2015.

Pulis has a reputation within the game for achieving solid results on small budgets and also maintains the record of never being relegated as a player, coach or manager. Throughout his managerial career Pulis has used the long ball style of play, and been known for placing an emphasis on defence and utilising set-pieces to pose a goal threat. He has a reputation for securing safety for struggling clubs, giving him a "Red Adair" type image which he finds frustrating.

Stoke City chairman Peter Coates stated that Pulis had studied, and was influenced by, Italian styles of play, saying: "The so-called Catenaccio defensive system interested him and the Italians haven't done too badly, have they, with their four World Cups?"

== Personal life ==
Pulis was born in the Pill area of Newport, in Wales. He was brought up there, with his father, Angelo, a steelworker, and his mother, Jean, as well as his brothers and sisters. His grandfather was born in Ħaż-Żabbar, Malta before he moved to Wales. Growing up in Newport, he supported Manchester United as well as attending matches at Cardiff City and Newport County. One of his brothers, Ray, also used to play for Newport and is currently chairman of Welsh non-league side Pill AFC. His son Anthony is a retired professional footballer who currently serves as an assistant coach for the Major League Soccer side Real Salt Lake. Pulis's former Bristol Rovers teammate Ian Holloway is Anthony's godfather. He also has a daughter.

Pulis was awarded an honorary degree at the University of Staffordshire on 10 July 2009. He received the reward for his contribution in helping sports journalism students at the university. He was also awarded the award at the University of Wales, Newport, on 15 April 2013. Pulis participated in the 2009 London Marathon to raise money for the Donna Louise Trust which assists a children hospice. He completed the marathon in 4 hours 31 minutes 57 seconds. In May 2010, Pulis climbed to the summit of Mount Kilimanjaro with Nick Hancock to raise money for the Stoke-on-Trent based charity the Donna Louise Trust. In March 2012, he escaped a driving ban for speeding after his lawyer claimed that the city of Stoke-on-Trent would suffer as a result. On 31 May 2012, Pulis was an Olympic Torch bearer for the 2012 Summer Olympics. On 1 June 2015, Pulis completed a 450-mile rowing challenge from Tower Bridge in London to the Eiffel Tower in Paris. He once again teamed up with Nick Hancock and other team members for the Donna Louise Hospice in Stoke. The seven-day nautical challenge eventually raised over £250,000 for the charity.

Pulis is a Catholic and regularly attends church. His mother died on 13 September 2010, the same day that Stoke had a Monday night fixture against Aston Villa. Pulis made an unexpected return to the dug-out after the half-time break, having missed the first half, amidst huge applause from the home crowd. At this time, Villa were 1–0 up but goals from Kenwyne Jones and Robert Huth gave Stoke a 2–1 win and their first points of the season.

== Career statistics ==
=== Player ===
- Tony Pulis at the English National Football Archive (subscription required)

Club	Season	League			FA Cup		League Cup		Other^{[A]}		Total	
Club	Season	Division	Apps	Goals	Apps	Goals	Apps	Goals	Apps	Goals	Apps	Goals
Bristol Rovers	1975–76	Second Division	4	0	0	0	0	0	0	0	4	0
Bristol Rovers	1976–77	Second Division	9	0	0	0	0	0	0	0	9	0
Bristol Rovers	1977–78	Second Division	23	0	4	0	0	0	1	0	28	0
Bristol Rovers	1978–79	Second Division	7	0	0	0	2	0	2	0	11	0
Bristol Rovers	1979–80	Second Division	34	3	1	0	2	0	0	0	37	3
Bristol Rovers	1980–81	Second Division	8	0	0	0	4	0	0	0	12	0
Bristol Rovers	Total		85	3	5	0	8	0	3	0	101	3
Happy Valley	1981–82	Hong Kong First Division	13	0	0	0	0	0	0	0	13	0
Happy Valley	Total		13	0	0	0	0	0	0	0	13	0
Bristol Rovers	1982–83	Third Division	17	0	0	0	0	0	0	0	17	0
Bristol Rovers	1983–84	Third Division	28	2	0	0	3	0	1	0	32	2
Bristol Rovers	Total		45	2	0	0	3	0	1	0	49	2
Newport County	1984–85	Third Division	37	0	2	1	1	0	5	0	45	1
Newport County	1985–86	Third Division	40	0	3	0	1	0	0	0	44	0
Newport County	Total		77	0	5	1	2	0	5	0	89	1
AFC Bournemouth	1986–87	Third Division	35	0	0	0	2	0	2	0	39	0
AFC Bournemouth	1987–88	Second Division	29	3	1	0	4	0	1	0	35	3
AFC Bournemouth	1988–89	Second Division	10	0	1	0	1	0	0	0	12	0
AFC Bournemouth	Total		74	3	2	0	7	0	3	0	86	3
Gillingham	1989–90	Fourth Division	16	0	0	0	0	0	1	0	17	0
Gillingham	Total		16	0	0	0	0	0	1	0	17	0
AFC Bournemouth	1990–91	Third Division	15	1	2	0	0	0	0	0	17	1
AFC Bournemouth	1991–92	Third Division	1	0	0	0	0	0	0	0	1	0
AFC Bournemouth	Total		16	1	2	0	0	0	0	0	18	1
Career Total			326	9	14	1	20	0	13	0	373	10

A. The "Other" column constitutes appearances and goals in the Anglo-Scottish Cup, Football League Trophy and Full Members Cup.

=== Manager ===
As of match played on 26 December 2020

Team	From	To	Record				
Team	From	To	G	W	D	L	Win %
AFC Bournemouth	9 June 1992	5 August 1994	110	31	40	39	28.18
Gillingham	31 July 1995	1 July 1999	218	94	62	62	43.12
Bristol City	5 July 1999	14 January 2000	33	10	14	9	30.30
Portsmouth	13 January 2000	12 October 2000	35	11	10	14	31.43
Stoke City	1 November 2002	28 June 2005	131	47	32	52	35.88
Plymouth Argyle	23 September 2005	14 June 2006	38	11	15	12	28.95
Stoke City	14 June 2006	21 May 2013	333	122	98	113	36.64
Crystal Palace	23 November 2013	14 August 2014	28	12	5	11	42.86
West Bromwich Albion	1 January 2015	20 November 2017	121	36	36	49	29.75
Middlesbrough	26 December 2017	17 May 2019	80	35	22	23	43.75
Sheffield Wednesday	13 November 2020	28 December 2020	10	1	4	5	10.00
Total			1,137	410	338	389	36.06

== Honours ==
=== Player ===
Happy Valley

- Hong Kong Senior Challenge Shield: 1982–83

Bournemouth

- Football League Third Division: 1986–87

=== Manager ===
Gillingham

- Football League Third Division runner-up: 1995–96

Stoke City

- Football League Championship runner-up: 2007–08
- FA Cup runner-up: 2010–11

Individual

- Football League Second Division Manager of the Month: February 1993
- Football League Third Division Manager of the Month: September 1995
- Football League Third Division Manager of the Season: 1995–96
- Football League Championship Manager of the Month: February 2005, April 2007, February 2008
- Premier League Manager of the Month: April 2014, February 2015
- Premier League Manager of the Season: 2013–14
- Inducted into LMA Hall of Fame 2016–17

== See also ==
- List of football managers with the most matches
