= Collinz Room =

American rock band

- Origin: Los Angeles, California
- Genres: Indie rock, punk, emo, grunge, hard rock
- Years active: 2002 – present
- Label: Redefined Records
- Members: Rick Amieva; Lew Nottke; Kris Campbell; *Luis "Chocs" Campos

Collinz Room is an American rock band from Los Angeles, California, formed in 2002.

== Biography ==
Formed in 2002 out of Los Angeles, California, Collinz Room's style is described as "a blend of raw rock with a soulful edge" by James James of Speak EZ radio and "a flavored addiction that begs for more" by Shawn Plunkett of Flare Magazine. Collinz Room is known for their dulcet vocals well balanced with a tenacious range of beats and riffs.

=== Achievements ===
Collinz Room has released three albums: Vampire Puppet, Silence the Insects, and Cymatic Paper Trails. In 2010, the single "Just Another Day" won them their second LA Music Award after being featured on the soundtrack to Saw IV. The band has played venues such as MTV's Campus Courtyard, Tide Fest, and the 2011 Warped Tour.

=== Members ===
The band members include Rick Amieva (vocals), Lew Nottke (guitar), Kris Campbell (bass), and Luis Campos "Chocs" (drums), and are known for their catchy tunes and eclectic style. Past member includes Jonny Whitton on the lead guitar and Jay Mcneal on the bass guitar.
