= Lew (surname) =

Lew is a surname. Notable people with the surname include:

- Barzillai Lew (1743–1822), American soldier and musician
- Cameron Lew (born 1995), American musician, Ginger Root
- Connor Lew (born 2005), American football player
- Emma Lew (born 1962), Australian poet
- Harry Lew (1884–1963), American basketball player
- Lew Hing (1858–1934), Chinese-born American industrialist
- Jack Lew (born 1955), United States Secretary of the Treasury
- James Lew (born 1952), American martial arts actor
- Michael Lew (born 1965), Dutch scientist
- Peter Lew (born 1970), Australian businessman, son of Solomon
- Randy Lew (born 1985), American poker player
- Ronald S. W. Lew (1941–2023), American jurist
- Shoshana Lew, (born 1983), American government administrator
- Solomon Lew (born 1945), Australian businessman
- Lew Syn Pau, Singaporean politician
- Walter K. Lew, Korean-American poet and scholar
- Lew Yih Wey (born 1991), Malaysian swimmer

== See also ==
- Levski (disambiguation)
- Elizabeth Van Lew (1818-1900), Union spy master during the American Civil War, abolitionist and philanthropist
- Liu, a Chinese surname sometimes spelled Lew
- Yoo (Korean surname), a Korean surname sometimes spelled Lew
