= Lew Bradford =

English footballer

Personal information
- Full name: Lewis Bradford
- Date of birth: 24 November 1916
- Place of birth: Swadlincote, England
- Date of death: October 1984 (aged 67)
- Place of death: Chorley, England
- Height: 5 ft 8 1/2 in (1.74 m)
- Position: Centre half

Senior career*
| Years | Team | Apps | (Gls) |
| 1934–1939 | Preston North End | 0 | (0) |
| 1946 | Kilmarnock | 5 | (0) |
| 1946–1948 | Bradford City | 68 | (1) |
| 1948–1949 | Newport County | 24 | (0) |
| 1949– | Trowbridge Town | | |
| Total | | 97 | (1) |
- * Club domestic league appearances and goals

Lewis Bradford (24 December 1916 – October 1984) was an English professional footballer who played as a centre half.

== Career ==
Born in Swadlincote, Bradford played for Preston North End, Kilmarnock, Bradford City and Newport County, making a total of 97 league appearances.

He later played non-league football for Trowbridge Town.
