= Levski =

Levski mostly refers to Vasil Levski (1840-1873), the national hero of Bulgaria, or places etc. named after him.

== Places ==
- Levski, Pleven Province, a town in Bulgaria
- Levski, Pazardzhik Province, a village in Panagyurishte Municipality, Bulgaria
- Levski, Varna Province, a village in Suvorovo Municipality, Bulgaria
- Levski Peak (Bulgaria), in the Balkan Mountains, in central Bulgaria
- Levski Peak (Antarctica), a mountain on Livingston Island, Antarctica
- Levski Ridge, a mountain ridge on Livingston Island, Antarctica
- Vasil Levski Boulevard, a road in Sofia, Bulgaria

== Other uses ==
- Levski Sofia, a Bulgarian football club
- Levski Sofia (sports club), a Bulgarian sports club
- Levski Volley, a Bulgarian volleyball team
- BC Levski Sofia, a Bulgarian basketball team

== See also ==
- Vasil Levski (disambiguation)
