= Lew Sharpe =

Australian rules footballer

Personal information
- Full name: Lewis Arthur Sharpe
- Born: 14 July 1906
- Died: 9 March 2000 (aged 93)
- Original team: Loch

Playing career^{1}
| Years | Club | Games (Goals) |
| 1926–1927 | St Kilda | 8 (1) |
| 1929–1930 | Footscray | 19 (7) |
| 1932 | Fitzroy | 6 (0) |
| 1934 | Essendon | 1 (0) |
| Total | | 34 (8) |
- ^{1} Playing statistics correct to the end of 1934.

Lewis Arthur Sharpe (14 July 1906 – 9 March 2000) was an Australian rules footballer who played with St Kilda, Footscray, Fitzroy and Essendon in the Victorian Football League (VFL).

Sharpe had a much traveled career, which began at Kernot in 1924. He then played with Loch the following year and joined St Kilda during the 1926 season. After a year and a half with St Kilda, he went to Wonthaggi. He resumed in the VFL in 1929 when he played 11 games for Footscray, the most he ever played in a league season. In 1930 he crossed to Blackwood as captain-coach but after a year was back in Melbourne, playing for Fitzroy. He captain-coached Dalyston to a premiership in 1933 and played at Essendon in 1934. Having played just once for Essendon, Sharpe returned to Loch for a season, before going to Archer's Creek as their new captain-coach.
