= Lieu =

Lieu may refer to:

== As a surname ==
- Alternate spelling of Liu
  - Chi-Lan Lieu, American television presenter
  - Judith Lieu (born 1951), British theologian
  - Liz Lieu (born 1974), Vietnamese professional poker player
  - Mandy Lieu (born 1985), Malaysian-American actress
  - Ted Lieu (born 1969), American politician

== Other uses ==
- French for location or place
  - in lieu of comes from the French expression au lieu de and means “in place of” or “instead of”
  - obituaries sometimes contain a request that attendees do not send flowers, see in lieu of flowers
- Le Lieu, a municipality in the canton of Vaud, Switzerland
- Lieu, American rapper known for pioneering the microgene robloxcore
