= Ray Mabbutt =

English footballer

Personal information
- Full name: Raymond William Mabbutt
- Date of birth: 13 March 1936
- Place of birth: Aylesbury, England
- Date of death: 31 October 2016 (aged 80)
- Position: Midfielder

Senior career*
Years	Team	Apps	(Gls)
1953–1956	Oxford City		
1956–1969	Bristol Rovers	395	(27)
1969–1971	Newport County	46	(14)
1971–1973	Trowbridge Town		
1974–1975	Clevedon Town		
- * Club domestic league appearances and goals

Raymond William Mabbutt (13 March 1936 – 31 October 2016) was an English footballer, the father of former players Gary Mabbutt and Kevin Mabbutt. Mabbutt played for Oxford City, Bristol Rovers, Newport County and Trowbridge Town. He later played for Clevedon Town for one season between 1974 and 1975, becoming the club's first fully professional paid player.
