= Lew Woodroffe =

English footballer

Personal information
- Full name: Lewis Christopher Woodroffe
- Date of birth: 29 October 1921
- Place of birth: Portsmouth, England
- Date of death: June 2015 (aged 93)
- Place of death: West Sussex, England
- Positions: Inside forward; outside forward

Senior career*
Years	Team	Apps	(Gls)
1945–1947	Manchester City	9	(1)
1947–1951	Watford	63	(6)
- Canterbury City
- * Club domestic league appearances and goals

Lewis Christopher Woodroffe (29 October 1921 – June 2015) was an English professional footballer. He played at inside or outside forward.

Born in Portsmouth in October 1921, his early adult life coincided with the Second World War, at a time when professional football competitions such as the Football League and FA Cup were suspended. He joined Manchester City as a professional in October 1945, and in the 1946–47 season he played and scored for the club in the Second Division. However, he was released on a free transfer at the end of the season, and joined Watford, of the Third Division South. He played 64 matches in all competitions for the side, scoring 6 goals, before leaving on a free transfer at the end of the 1950–51 season. He later played for Canterbury City, who at the time were playing in the Kent League.
