= Murray Fishlock =

English footballer

Personal information
- Full name: Murray Edward Fishlock
- Date of birth: 23 September 1973 (age 53)
- Place of birth: Marlborough, England
- Height: 5 ft 7 in (1.70 m)
- Position: Left back

Youth career
- Swindon Town

Senior career*
Years	Team	Apps	(Gls)
1992–1994	Gloucester City		
1994	Trowbridge Town		
1994–1998	Hereford United	110	(6)
1998–2000	Yeovil Town	47	(2)
2002	Woking		
2002	→ Melksham Town (loan)		
2002	Chippenham Town		
2007	Pewsey Vale		

International career
1999	England semi-pro	1	(0)
- * Club domestic league appearances and goals

Murray Edward Fishlock (born 23 September 1973) is an English former footballer who played in the Football League as a left back for Hereford United.

== Career ==
Fishlock was born in Marlborough, Wiltshire. He began his football career as a junior with Swindon Town, but never appeared for the first team. He left for Gloucester City in 1992, where he made 74 appearances and scored 6 goals in all competitions. He joined Trowbridge Town in order to be nearer home and college, but manager John Layton soon signed him for Third Division club Hereford United. He made his debut in the Football League on 1 October 1994 in a 2–1 home win against Scunthorpe United. He had three seasons in the Football League and one in the Conference with Hereford before moving to Yeovil Town.

He played 57 games in all competitions for Yeovil, scoring twice, and was capped for the England semi-professional representative team, before suffering a back injury in a game against Dover Athletic in January 2000. The injury would eventually force him to retire from the game, after two years on the sidelines and a few appearances with lower-league clubs including Woking, Melksham Town, Chippenham Town, and Pewsey Vale.

From September 2005 to March 2014, Fishlock worked for the Football Foundation. After a brief period working for LK2 Architects and LK2 Sport & Leisure as a consultant, Murray then returned to the Football Foundation in 2017.
