= Lew Nottke =

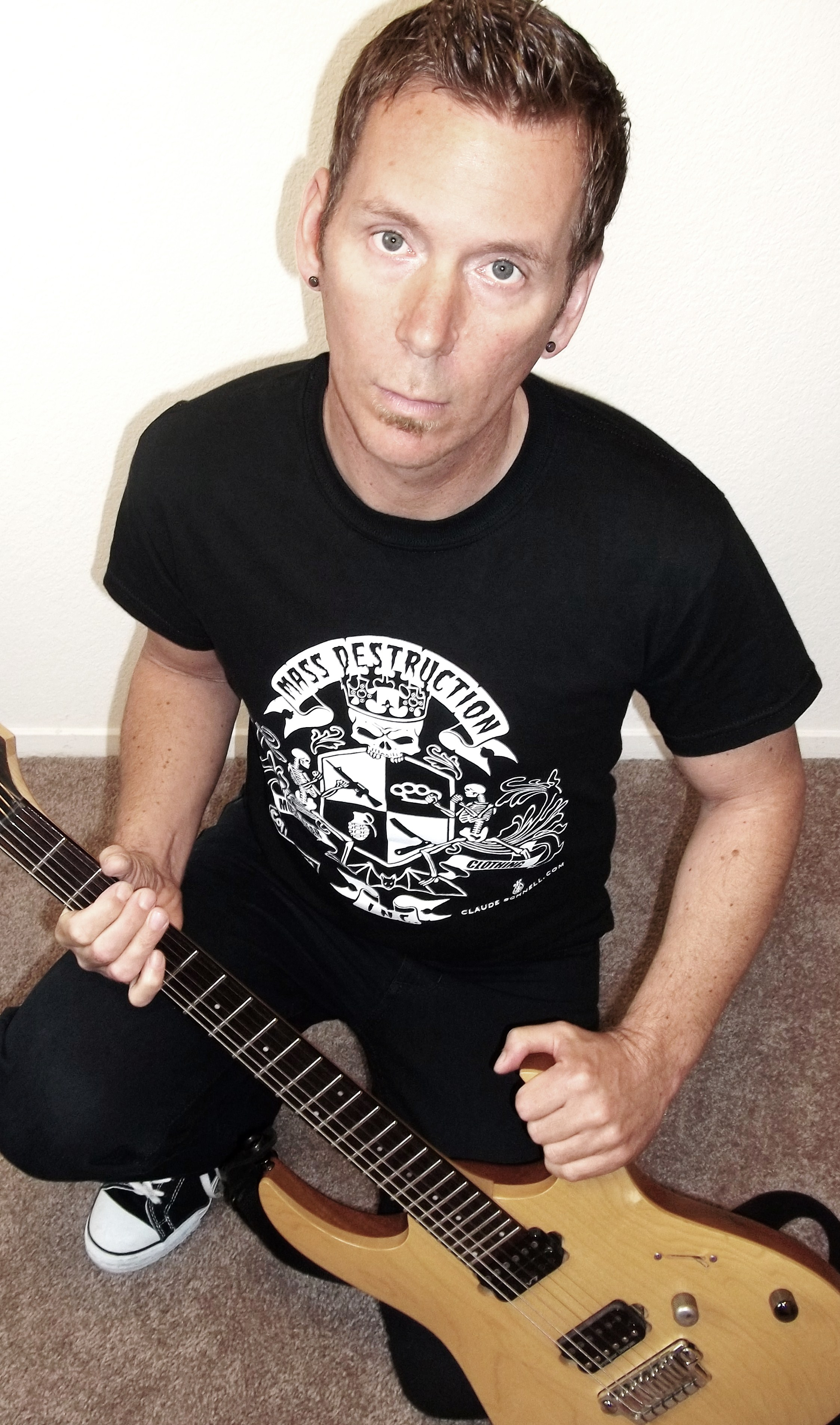
- Lewis Nottke Facebook Photo

Background information
- Origin: Torrance, CA
- Genres: Rock, punk, metal, grunge, hard rock
- Instrument: Guitar
- Label: BHP Music
- Website: www.lewnottke.com

Lewis Nottke is an American guitarist. He was the guitarist in Beat the Bone and is currently the guitarist in the Los Angeles-based band Collinz Room.

== Early life ==
Lew was born in Torrance, California and started playing the guitar when he was 14 years old. He created the band with his brother Ray Nottke called Beat the Bone in the late 1990s that ran to the top of the college charts.

== Past Projects ==
Beat the Bone included Lew Nottke on guitar, Ray Nottke on bass, and Eric Saint James followed by Jay Smith on drums. The band released a CD called Naked in which was featured on college metal radios across the United States. Beat the Bone toured with the likes of Iron Maiden, Queensryche, Rob Halford, etc.

Lew also composed and performed the song Planet E, which was released by BHP Music on a cd entitled Guitar Masters Vol. 2 The CD features places Lew and the rest of Beat the Bone alongside legends such as Carlos Santana, Jimmy Page and more. Their music is still featured on MTV Pimp My Ride, Fox NHL Sports including the Los Angeles Kings, The Red Bull Romaniacs and others.

Lew was in a band called Even X, who performed with Drowning Pool and toured with Dope in 2007. Lew left the band to pursue his own project.

In 2007 the band Hazner was formed with Jeff and Chris Zazueta, Lew Nottke, Darrell Gretzner, and Dave Harris. The band is best known for their track alongside Lew titled “Good Times, Bad Times” released on the album Led Zeppelin Salute - Get Some More Led Out. Lew and the band decided to part ways in 2010 due to creative differences and musical direction.

== Current projects ==
Currently Lew is in the band Collinz Room, they are currently pushing the release of their new album "Cymatic Paper Trails".

== Gear ==
Lew uses a Randall RM series amplifier and endorses Washburn Guitars.
