= Lev Hakak =

Israeli-American lawyer, academic, and writer

- לב חקק
- Born: 1944 (age 81–82); Mandatory Palestine
- Education: Hebrew University of Jerusalem; Tel Aviv University; University of California, Los Angeles
- Occupations: Lawyer; academic; novelist; poet

Lev Hakak (Hebrew: לב חקק) is an Israeli-born American lawyer, academic, novelist and poet. He is a professor of Hebrew Language and Literature at the University of California, Los Angeles (UCLA) and the author of several books on Hebrew literature. He has written four poetry collections and two novels.

== Early life ==
Lev Hakak was born in 1944 in Mandatory Palestine. His parents were Iraqi Jews who experienced pro-Nazi antisemitic sentiments in Iraq in the 1940s and emigrated to Israel in 1951–1952.

Hakak graduated from the Hebrew University of Jerusalem, where he received a bachelor of arts degree in Hebrew Literature and Political Science in 1967. He attended graduate school at Tel Aviv University in 1968–1970, and he earned a PhD in Modern Hebrew Literature from UCLA in 1974. His thesis was entitled Modes of Organization in Modern Hebrew Free Verse.

== Career ==
Hakak began his career as a poet in the early 1960s, when he published two poetry collections. In 1977, he published his first novel, The Ingathered. His work challenges the canon of Hebrew literature. He has published articles in The Huffington Post.

Hakak has been a professor of Hebrew Language and Literature at UCLA since 1974. He is the author of several scholarly books on Hebrew Literature. His first scholarly volume, published in 1977, focused on poets Avraham Ben-Yitzhak, Amir Gilboa, Natan Zakh and Shlomo Zamir. In 1981, he was one of the first scholars to analyze Mizrahi Jews in Hebrew Literature. His 2009 book, The Emergence of Modern Hebrew Literature in Babylon from 1735-1950, is about Jewish poetry in Iraq.

Hakak is also a member of the Israel Bar Association and the State Bar of California.

== Personal life ==
Hakak resides in Beverly Hills, California. In 2016, he was one of 24 Beverly Hills residents who submitted an application for an appointment to fill a vacancy on the Beverly Hills City Council after councilmember William W. Brien resigned. However, Hakak withdrew his application prior to the interview.

== Works ==
=== Poetry collections ===
- Hakak, Lev (1962). Still Bound In Spring.
- Hakak, Lev (1963). My Lord, You Are Good.
- Hakak, Lev (1981). To Bequeath Hebrew Poetry in Los Angeles.

=== Novels ===
- Hakak, Lev (1977). The Ingathered.
- Hakak, Lev (1984). Stranger Among Brothers.
- Hakak, Lev. A House on a Hill (1994).

=== Short stories ===
- Hakak, Lev (1981). If I Forget Thee.

=== Scholarly books ===
- Hakak, Lev (1977). With Four Poets: Avraham Ben Yitzhak, Amir Gilboa, Natan Zakh, Shlomo Zamir.
- Hakak, Lev (1981). Inferiors and Superiors: Oriental Jews in the Hebrew Short Story.
- Hakak, Lev (1985). Chapters in Mizrshi Jewish Literature.
- Hakak, Lev (1993). Equivocal Dreams: Studies in Modern Hebrew Literature. Hoboken, New Jersey: Ktav. ISBN 9780881254662. OCLC 28111455.
- Hakak, Lev (2001). Modern Hebrew Literature Made Into Films. Lanham, Maryland: University Press of America. ISBN 9780761819844. OCLC 47002170.
- Hakak, Lev. Budding of Modern Hebrew Creativity in Babylon (Hebrew). The Babylonian Jewry Heritage Center, Research Institute of Babylonian Jewry, 2003. 371 pp.
- Hakak, Lev. The Collected Essays of Rabbi SHelomo Bekhor Hutsin. Hakkibutz Hameuchad, 2005 (Hebrew). 281 pp.
- Hakak, Lev. A Pious Man Faces Sinners: The Book of Moral Reroof by Ezra Habavli (Hebrew). Hakibbutz Hameuchad, 2008. 329 pp.
- Introduction, References and Synopses by Lev Hakak. Sasson Mordekhai Mosheh, The Voice of Mirth (Hebrew). Hakibbutz Hameuchad, 2015.231 pp.
- Hakak, Lev (2009). The Emergence of Modern Hebrew Literature in Babylon from 1735-1950. West Lafayette, Indiana: Purdue University Press. ISBN 9781557535146. OCLC 309836002.
- Hakak, Lev. Beneath the Sugarcoating: The Voice of Mirth by Sasson Mordekhai Mosheh, with Introduction, References and Synopses. The Babylonian Jewry Heritage Center, Research Institute of Babylonian Jewry. 2012. 415 pp.
- Hakak, Lev. Song of the Whitewasher. Hadassa Word Press, 2016. 75 pp.*
- Hakak, Lev. The Gift of Life. Hadassa Word Press, 2018. 120 pages.
- Hakak, Lev. Reading Modern Hebrew Poetry and Prose. Hadassa Word Press, 2017. 321 pp.

Editorial Work

- Hakak, Lev, Editor of Hadoar, the Hebrew Quarterly of Histadruth Ivrith of America, September 2002 - Summer 2004.
- Hakak, Lev, Editor of Hador: The Hebrew Annual of America, 2006 on.
- Hakak, Lev, Co-Editor with Zev Garber, Shmuel (Stephen) Katz and Zev Garber. The Maskil in Our Time: Studies in Honor of Moshe Pelli. Hakkibutz Hameuchad, 2017.
