= Lew Booth =

Welsh footballer

Personal information
- Full name: Llewellyn Booth
- Date of birth: 28 February 1912
- Place of birth: Merthyr Tydfil, Wales
- Date of death: July 1984
- Position: Inside forward

Senior career*
Years	Team	Apps	(Gls)
19??–1934	Swansea Town	1	(0)
193?–1936	Bangor City		
1936–1946	Bristol City	65	(22)
- * Club domestic league appearances and goals

Llewellyn Booth (28 February 1912 – July 1984) was a Welsh professional footballer who played as an inside forward. He made over 60 Football League appearances in the years before the Second World War.

== Career ==
Booth played initially for Swansea Town but was unable to secure a regular first team place. Booth moved to Bangor City and became a prolific goalscorer for the team. Bob Hewison signed Booth from Bangor City for £350 for Bristol City in November 1936. Booth made his debut for Bristol City at inside right replacing Bob Armstrong in a 3–1 win over Newport County on 14 November 1936. The match was unusual as Bill Roberts normally a right back was promoted to centre forward and scored a hat-trick for Bristol City. Booth shared the inside right position with Armstrong for the remainder of the season making 19 appearances scoring one goal in 1936–37 as Bristol City finished in 16th place in the Third Division South. Booth began the 1937–38 season at inside left before switching inside forwards positions with Joe Brain newly signed from Swansea Town after five matches. Bristol City began the season in mid table but finished strongly to end up as runners up missing out on promotion to Millwall by a single point. City lost only one of their last 14 league matches but Booth played in only two of this sequence of games. Booth made 21 appearances scoring six goals including four goals in the opening four matches. Bristol City played in the Football League Division Three South Cup in 1937–38 with Booth scoring in the 2–0 semi final win v Millwall. Booth did not feature in the two legged final, lost 2–6 on aggregate to Reading, that was held over to the following season. In 1938–39 Bristol City finished eighth in the Third Division South and Booth did not play until November when he scored three goals in his first four matches at inside left. He established a regular place at inside left in January 1939 taking the opportunity by scoring nine goals in his first eight matches including three instances of two goals in a game in 2–0 wins v Bournemouth and at Newport County and a double in a 3–1 win versus Clapton Orient. Booth made 23 appearances scoring 15 goals in 1938–39. Booth made a further two appearances in the truncated 1939–40 season. In the war time regional leagues Booth continued to play intermittently with 17 appearances scoring six goals. Booth made a final appearance in the regional league after the war in 1946.

Booth continued to live locally until his death in July 1984.
