= Lev Shcheglov =

Russian physician (1946–2020)

- Born: 28 August 1946; Leningrad, Soviet Union
- Died: 11 December 2020 (aged 74); Saint Petersburg, Russia
- Education: Saint Petersburg State Medical Academy
- Scientific career
- Fields: sexology, somatoform disorders, psychotherapy

Lev Shcheglov (28 August 1946 – 11 December 2020) was a Russian physician who focused on sexology and psychotherapy.

== Biography ==
Shcheglov was considered the leading authority on sexological matters in Russia. He published 230 scientific works, among them 20 monographs and textbooks.

He died from COVID-19 during the COVID-19 pandemic in Russia. He is buried in St. Petersburg at the Preobrazhenskoye Jewish cemetery.

== Publications ==
In English

- Shcheglov, Lev (1993). "Medical Sexology". In Kon, Igor; Riordan, James (eds.). Sex and Russian Society. Indiana University Press. ISBN 9780253332011.

In Russian

- Щеглов Л. Записки сексолога. — Амфора, 2009. — ISBN 978-5-367-00947-7
- Щеглов Л. Всё про секс: от А до Я. — Амфора, Ред Фиш, 2005. — ISBN 5-483-00129-X
- Щеглов Л., Билич Г. Мужская сексуальность. — Новая Волна, Умеренков, 2004. — ISBN 5-7864-0198-7, ISBN 5-94368-039-X
- Щеглов Л. Энциклопедия секса, или 1001 ночь с доктором Щегловым. — Алетейя, 2002. — ISBN 5-89329-524-2
- Щеглов Л., Фрай М. Книга извращений. — Амфора, 2002. — ISBN 5-94278-279-2 [23]
- Щеглов Л. Лабиринты плоти или история болезни мадам Елены. — ЛИК, 2000. — ISBN 5-86038-070-4
- Щеглов Л. Сексология и сексопатология. Врачу и пациенту. — Культ-информ-пресс, 1998. — ISBN 5-8392-0154-5
- Щеглов Л. Не только о сексе. — Комплект, 1997. — ISBN 5-7837-0026-6
- Щеглов Л. Неврозы и сексуальные расстройства. — 1996.
- Щеглов Л. Яблоко доктора Щеглова, или Что осталось за кадром. — АРТ-Пресс, 1995. — OCLC 36759865
- Щеглов Л. Доктор Щеглов о сексе. — Фирма «Латона», 1995. — ISBN 5-88577-004-2
- Щеглов Л. Сексология. Врачу и пациенту. — СПб.: Олма-Пресс, 2001. — 384 с. — 3000 экз. — ISBN 5-7654-1068-5, ISBN 5-224-02421-8
- Щеглов Л. Групповая ненависть как двигатель новейшей истории / Русский имаго 2000. Исследования по психоанализу культуры. СПб., 2001, с. 114-116.
- Щеглов Л. Некоторые аспекты психоаналитического подхода в сексологической практике. // Вопросы сексологии. СПб., 1992, с. 70-72.
- Щеглов Л. Психосоматическая модель сексуальных расстройств. СПб., 1993. - 32 с.
- Щеглов Л. Психосоматические соотношения и психоанализ. / Вопросы психоанализа. СПб., 1993, с. 76-89.
- Щеглов Л. Эрос в зеркале культуры / Русский имаго 2001. Исследования по психоанализу культуры. СПб., 2002, с. 243-251.
- Щеглов Л. Лабиринты страсти.
- Щеглов Л. Андрогин.
