= Lew A. Nelson =

American test pilot

Lewis A. Nelson was a former Northrop chief test pilot who took the T-38 on its maiden flight. He tested the F-89, N-156, the F-5 and the T-38, exceeding Mach 1 in each and also made the first flight of the YA-9A in 1972. A recipient of two Distinguished Flying Crosses, the IAS Student Awards and four Air Medals, Nelson is a founding member and Fellow of the Society of Experimental Test Pilots. Throughout his career, Nelson logged over 5,000 hours on a variety of aircraft.
