= Luis Campos (musician) =

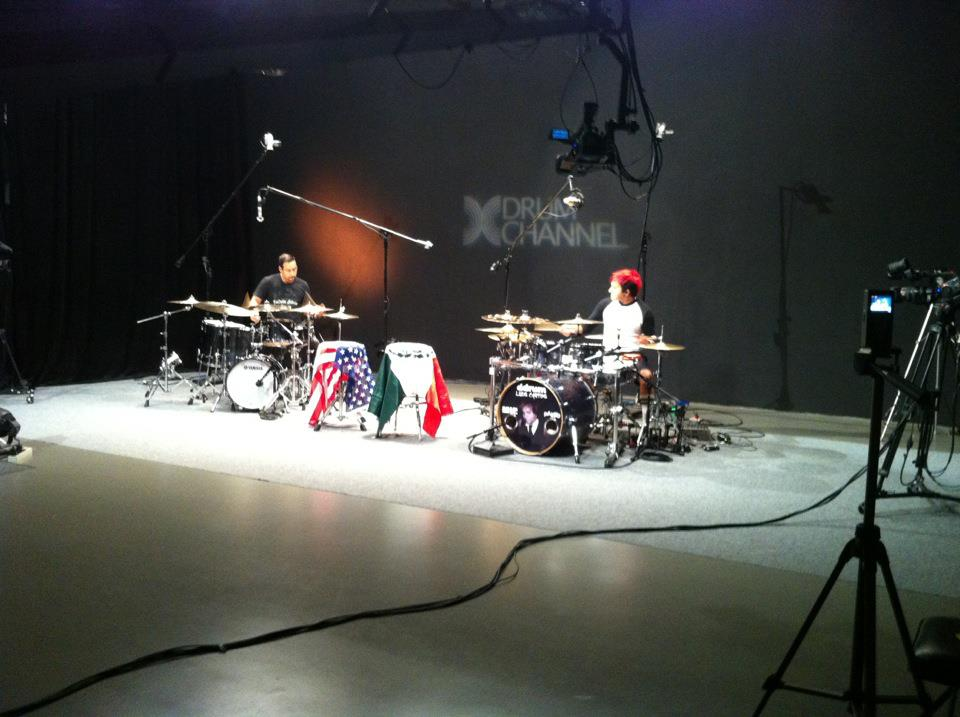
- Luis Campos with Antonio Sánchez, DrumChannel Studios, 2012

Background information
- Born: Culiacán, Mexico
- Genres: rock, jazz
- Occupation: Musician
- Instrument: Drums
- Years active: 2000–present
- Label: Universal/Redefined Records

Luis Campos, also known by the stage name Chocs (born June 5), is a Mexican/American punk rock jazz drummer and member of the band Delux.

== Early life ==
Luis Campos was born in Culiacán, Sinaloa, Mexico and started playing drums at the age of sixteen. He performed with several bands for a few years in Culiacan. In 2000 he moved to Mexico City to study at Fermata school of music.

== Career ==
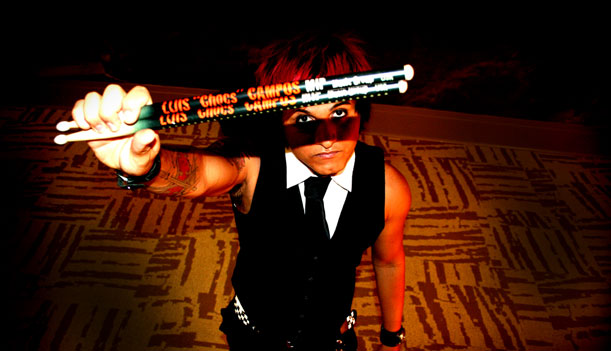

Campos kept pursuing a career as a rock and jazz drummer after moving to Los Angeles. He was hired as musical director for Puerto Rican pop singer Noelia in 2006. That same year he joined a rock punk band and toured the United States. In 2009 he signed a record deal with company MIP Music Group to produce an instructional DVD, Not Just Drumming and the album Time for Sound at Drumchannel Studios. DW Drums founder Don Lombardi directed the DVD, which includes a live performance of Campos' Jazz Trio, featuring Ric Fierabracci on bass and Jeff Miley on guitar; a 15-minute interview with his trio by Don Lombardi and 3 rock tracks. In 2010 he signed with cymbal company Paiste, drum company Ddrums, Pro Racket Drum Cases, Eccentric Systems, KOPF Acoustic Cajones, and a second deal with MIP Music Group. He was invited to perform at the Laguna Drum Fest in 2010, one of the main drum festivals in Mexico. In 2012 Luis Campos was invited to perform a drum duo with worldwide Antonio Sanchez at DrumChannel studios. The performance was followed by an interview with drummer Curt Bisquera.
