= Lev =

Lev or LEV may refer to:

== People and fictional characters ==
- Lev (given name)
- Lev (surname)

== Currency ==
- Bulgarian lev, the currency of Bulgaria from 1880 to 2025

== Places ==
- Lev, Azerbaijan, a village
- Lev (crater), a tiny lunar crater

== Religion ==
- an abbreviation for Leviticus, the third book of the Hebrew Bible and the Torah
- Lay eucharistic visitor, an extraordinary minister of Holy Communion approved by a church (usually Episcopalian or Lutheran) to bring Communion to the homebound
- Libreria Editrice Vaticana, the Vatican Publishing House

== Transportation ==
- Leven railway station in Fife, Scotland
- Leyland Experimental Vehicle, a type of British experimental railbus
- Light electric vehicle, an E-bike
- Low emission vehicle, a motor vehicle that emits relatively low levels of motor vehicle emissions
- Lunar Excursion Vehicle, an early name for the Apollo Lunar Module

== Political and other ==
- Lesser evil voting (LEV)
- Lev (political party), a now-defunct political party in Israel
- LEV (cable system), a submarine cable system linking countries in the eastern Mediterranean
- Lev!, a Swedish glass artwork
- Bulgarian lev, the former currency of Bulgaria until 2025
- HC Lev Praha, a professional ice hockey team in the Czech Republic
- HC Lev Poprad, a Kontinental Hockey League based in Poprad, Slovakia, in the 2011–2012 season
- Laborious Extra-Orbital Vehicle, a mecha from the video game Zone of the Enders
- Local exhaust ventilation, the process of "changing" or replacing air to improve indoor air quality; see Ventilation (architecture) § Local exhaust ventilation
- Longevity escape velocity, a hypothetical situation wherein the average human lifespan grows faster than time passes

== See also ==
- Le V, a hotel in Montreal, Quebec, Canada
- Lew (disambiguation)
- Lvov (disambiguation)
- Lvovo (disambiguation)
- Lvovsky (disambiguation)
