= Lemberg (disambiguation) =

Lemberg is the German name for the city of Lviv, Ukraine.

Lemberg is one of the German names for the town of Lwówek Śląski, Poland.

It may also refer to:

== Places ==
=== Settlements ===
- Lemberg, Saskatchewan, a municipality in Canada
- Lemberg, Moselle, a municipality in Lorraine, France
- Lemberg, Germany, a municipality in Rhineland-Palatinate, Germany
- Lemberg pri Šmarju, a town near Šmarje pri Jelšah, Slovenia
- Lemberg pri Novi Cerkvi a town near Vojnik, Slovenia
- Sankt Magdalena am Lemberg, a village in Styria, Austria

=== Facilities and structures ===
- Lemberg Castle, Lemberg, Germany
- Lemberg Airport, Lemberg, Saskatchewan, Canada
- Lemberg University, now Lviv University in Lviv, Ukraine

=== Geographic features ===
Hills or mountains in Germany

- Lemberg (Swabian Jura) (1,015 m), the highest mountain in the Swabian Jura, east of Rottweil, Baden-Württemberg, southern Germany
- Lemberg (Nahe) (422 m), a hill on the river Nahe, Rhineland-Palatinate
- Lemberg (Stuttgart) (384 m), a hill between Weilimdorf and Feuerbach, Stuttgart
- Lemberg (Affalterbach) (365 m), a hill near Affalterbach, Baden-Württemberg
- Lemberg (Rabenau) (307 m), a hill in the municipality of Rabenau, Hesse

== Other uses ==
- Lemberg (horse) (1907-1928), a Thoroughbred racehorse

== See also ==
- Lemberg Land (1340-1772), a subdivision of the Kingdom of Poland, with Lviv as its capital
- Lemberg Ghetto (1941-1943), Lemberg, Lemberg, Ukraine; in WWII
- Battle of Lemberg (disambiguation)
- Lemberg pogrom (disambiguation)
- Lemberger, a surname
- Aivars Lembergs, Latvian politician and businessman
- Lemberk Castle, in the Lusatian Mountains, the Czech Republic
- Lviv (disambiguation)
- Lvov (disambiguation)
- Lwów (disambiguation)
