= Lwów (disambiguation) =

Lwów is the Polish name for Lviv, Ukraine; a city formerly in the Polish-Lithuanian Commonwealth.

Lwów or Lwow may also refer to:

== Places ==
- Lwów Ghetto, a German-Nazi ghetto
- Lwów Land, an administrative unit of the Kingdom of Poland
- Lwów Voivodeship, a voivodeship (province) of the Second Polish Republic, from 1918 to 1939
- Lwów Voivodeship (1944–1945), a voivodeship (province) of Poland from 1944 to 1945
- Lwówek Śląski, a town in the Lower Silesian Voivodeship
- Haren, Germany, briefly known as Lwów in 1945, as part of the Polish occupation zone in Germany

== Other uses ==
- Lwów (ship), an 1868 Polish sailing ship
- Lwów Eaglets, a term of affection that is applied to the Polish child soldiers who defended the city of Lwów
- Lwów Oath, an oath made on April 1, 1656 by Polish king John II Casimir
- Lwów School of Mathematics, a group of Polish mathematicians
- Aaron Moses Lwow, 18th century grammarian, scribe, and dayyan of Lemberg

== See also ==
- Lwów pogrom (disambiguation)
- Battle of Lwów (disambiguation)
- Lvov (disambiguation), including the surname Lwow/Lwowa
- Lviv (disambiguation)
- Lemberg (disambiguation)
