= Gerard Behar Center =

Arts centre in Jerusalem

Coordinates: 31.7810°N 35.2129°E

- מרכז ז'ראר בכר
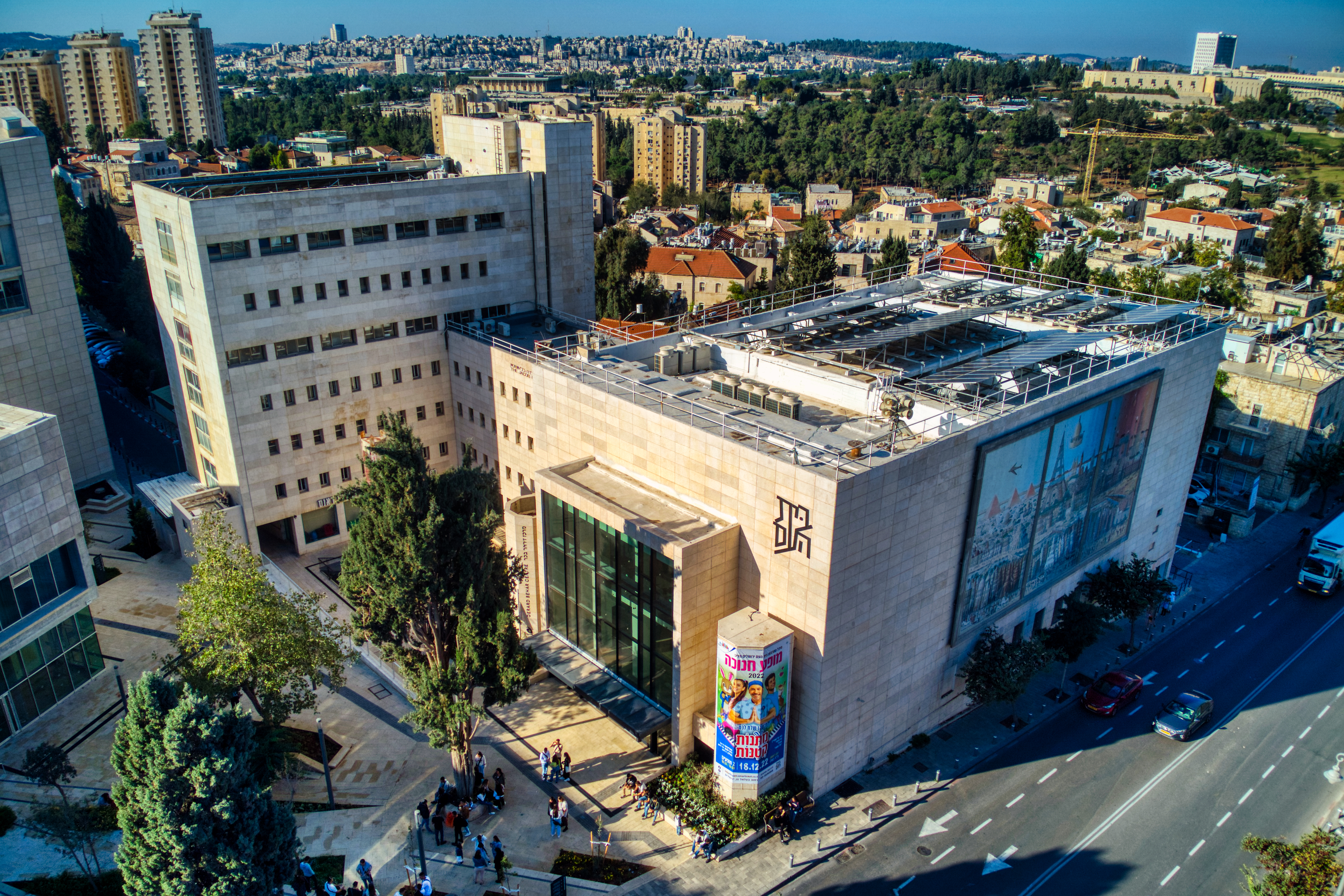
- Interactive map of the Gerard Behar Center area
- Former names: Beit Ha'Am

General information
- Status: Completed
- Type: Arts centre
- Location: 11 Bezalel Street, Jerusalem, Israel
- Groundbreaking: 1950
- Completed: 1961
- Opened: 1961
- Renovated: 1983

Design and construction
- Architects: A. Hoffman, David Reznik

Renovating team
- Architect: David Reznik

Other information
- Seating capacity: 650-seat and 200-seat theatres

Website
- gerard-behar.jerusalem.muni.il

Gerard Behar Center (Hebrew: מרכז ז'ראר בכר) is a major arts centre in Jerusalem, for independent theatre, dance, and musical productions, children's shows, art exhibitions, artist workshops, and festivals. In 2010 the center hosted over 900 events with attendance in excess of 263,600 participants. The center includes two theatres and is home to two dance companies, Kolben and Vertigo.

Formerly known as Beit Ha'Am, in 1961 the newly opened site was the venue for the trial of Nazi officer Adolf Eichmann, who sat in a specially-made bulletproof glass booth during the proceedings. After the trial, the building reverted to its use as a cultural center, but in 1983 the complex was upgraded to an arts centre by the Jerusalem Foundation with funding from Eliezer and Lucie Behar of France, who renamed the center in memory of their son, Gerard (*26.6.1936 in Prague; +22.9.1964 in Bogota). In 1987 the Gerard Behar Center was incorporated into the newly named Jacob & Hilda Blaustein Civic Center, which encompasses the two theatres, a dance studio, a municipal library, an adult education program, and an ulpan.

== History ==
Beit Ha'Am (Hebrew: בית העם, literally, "People's House") was a public cultural program operating in various cities in Israel; it was underway in Jerusalem by 1904. It provided public lectures, cultural evenings, a reading library, and a venue in which people could meet and discuss the issues of the day. Lacking a permanent home, the program moved from place to place in the vicinity of Street of the Prophets, with one of its better-known locations being on Isaiah Street, to the rear of the Histadrut building on Straus Street. In the 1930s and 1940s, Beit Ha'Am convened in various downtown theatres, including the Zion Cinema, the Eden Theater, the Orion Theater, and the Edison Theater, the latter of which had seating for over 2,000. After the establishment of the State of Israel, Beit Ha'Am occupied the Perlstein building at 70 Jaffa Road.

Jewish historian and ethnographer Raphael Patai was a frequent speaker for the popular lecture series; in his book, Journeyman in Jerusalem: Memories and Letters, 1933–1947, he recalls his well-attended lecture at a commemorative evening for Theodor Herzl in 1937, a lecture on Josephus which was not received as well, and a lecture on "Jewish sea battles". In 1944 Patai introduced a Jewish folklore studies component to Beit Ha'Am and was the scientific director for that segment.

In 1950 the cornerstone was laid for a permanent building for Beit Ha'Am on Bezalel Street in the Nachlaot neighborhood. The land had been purchased by the Jewish National Fund for this purpose, and architect A. Hoffman designed the building. While construction commenced before the declaration of the state of Israel, the project was abandoned with the onset of the 1948 Arab–Israeli war. In 1955 the project was taken over by the Jerusalem Municipality, which hired architect David Reznik to complete the plans. The building was finally completed in 1961.

== Trial of Adolf Eichmann ==
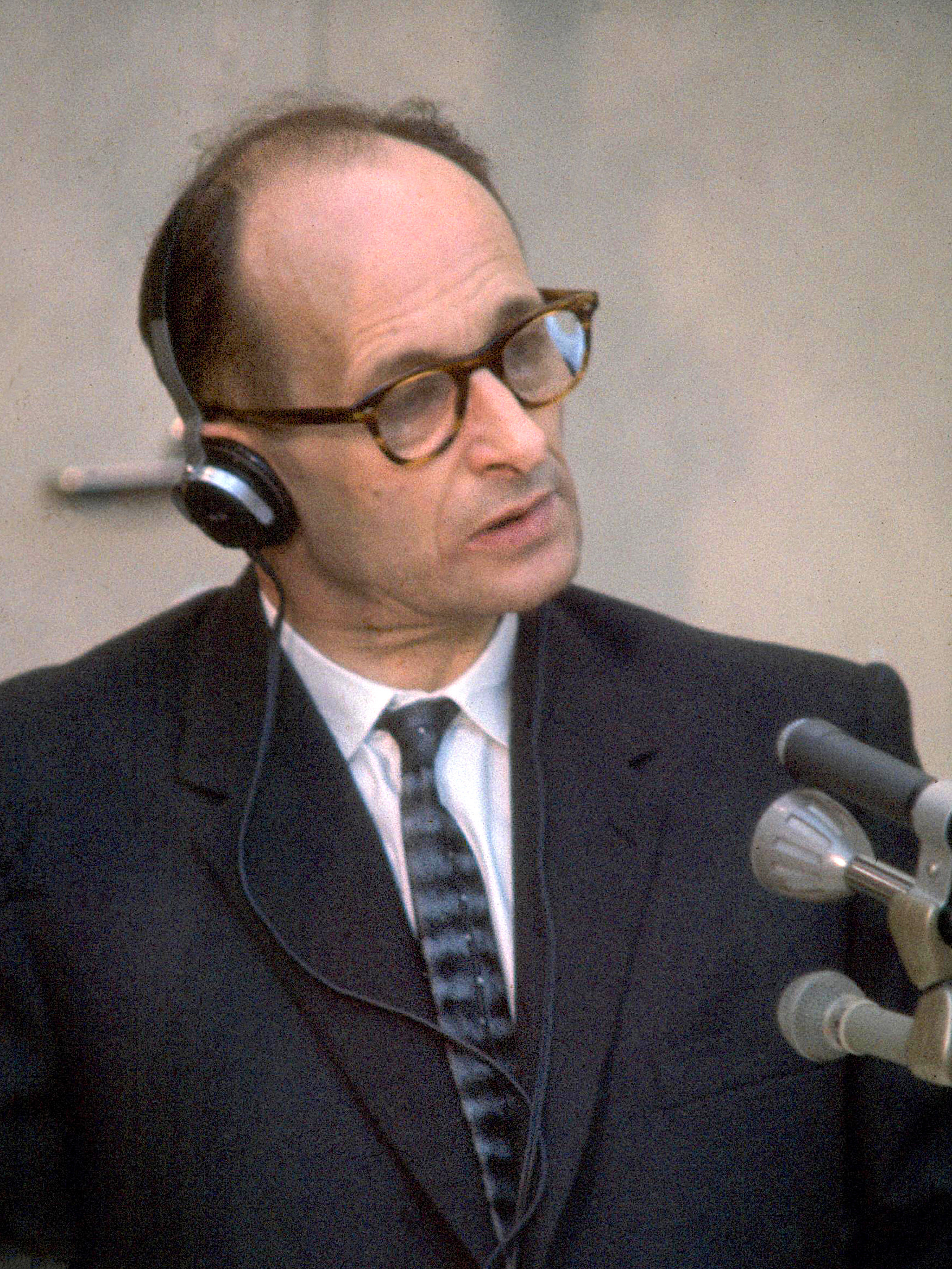
Adolf Eichmann sits in a bulletproof glass booth at his trial

With the capture of the Nazi officer Adolf Eichmann in Buenos Aires and the decision by the Israeli government to try him for crimes against humanity, the newly opened Beit Ha'Am was chosen as the site for the trial, in part due to its ability to accommodate the many journalists and media correspondents expected to attend. The building was enclosed by a 10-foot (3.0 m) high security fence and a holding cell for Eichmann was established on-site for the duration of the trial.

The four-month trial, which began on April 11, 1961, was highly publicized and covered by radio, newspaper, and television journalists from around the world. Of the 756 seats made available in the theatre, 474 were designated for members of the press; journalists also viewed the proceedings via closed-circuit television in an adjacent press room. Another 570 viewers watched on a closed-circuit screen in the nearby Ratisbonne Monastery. Videotape was flown daily to the United States for broadcast the following day. A bulletproof glass wall was erected between the stage where the judges sat and the spectator seating, and Eichmann sat inside his own bulletproof glass booth with armed guards at his side. The trial concluded on August 14, 1961; on December 13 the court found Eichmann guilty of crimes against humanity. The death penalty was issued on December 15. Eichmann's attorneys appealed to the Israeli Supreme Court, but the court upheld the verdict on May 29, 1962. After a last-minute appeal for clemency to Israeli president Yitzhak Ben-Zvi was also refused, Eichmann was executed shortly after midnight on June 1, 1962.

== Renovation ==
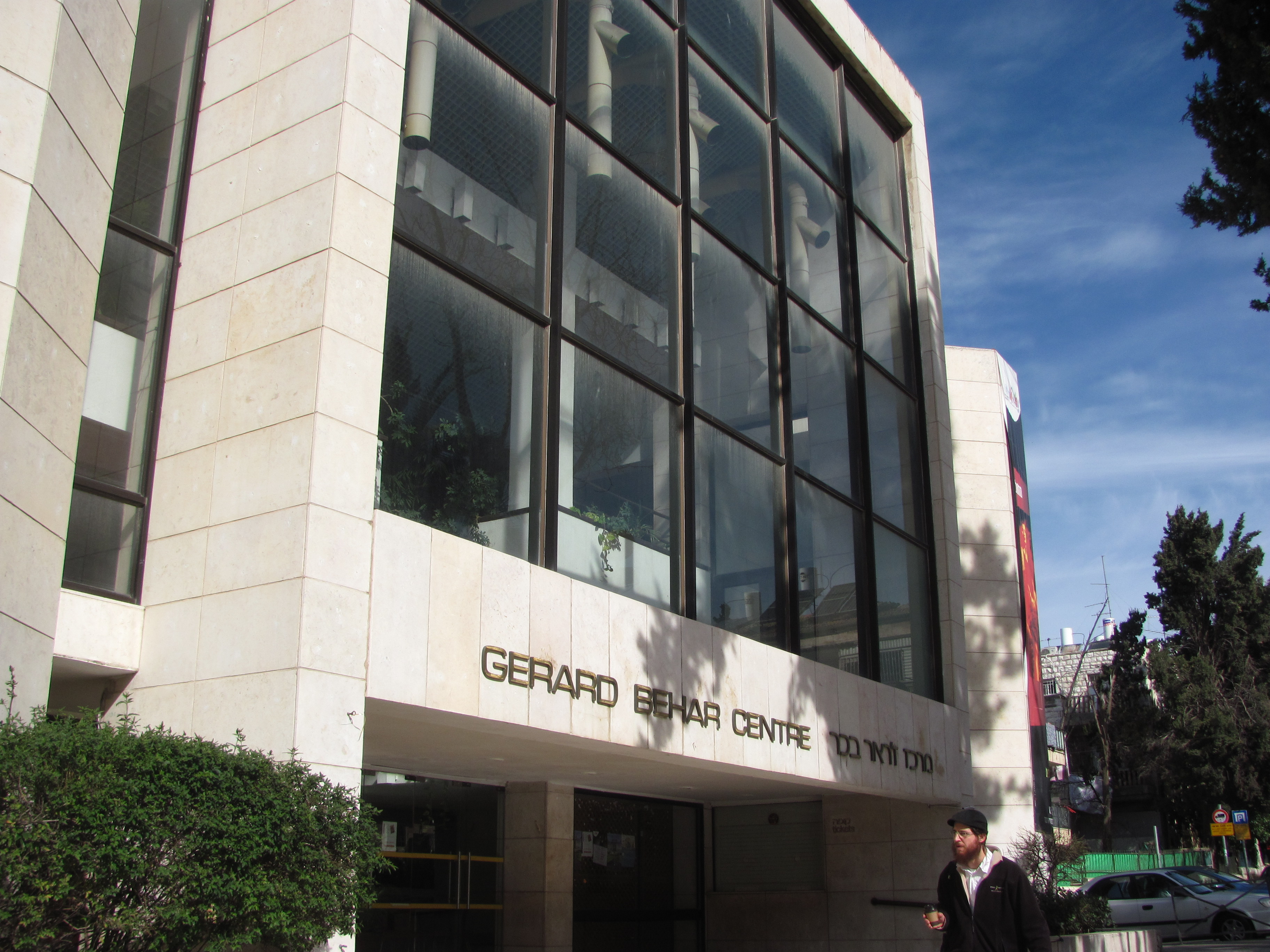
Gerard Behar Center entrance

Following the Eichmann trial, Beit Ha'Am reverted to its function as a cultural center. In the early 1980s the Jerusalem Foundation undertook the creation of a major arts centre on the site and found a donor in Eliezer and Lucie Behar of France. The renovation, designed by David Reznik and completed in 1983, upgraded the theatre in which the Eichmann trial had taken place into a 650-seat performance venue for theatre, music, and dance, and added a second, 200-seat theatre to the complex. Both theatres are handicapped accessible. The theatre complex was renamed the Gerard Behar Center in memory of the donors' son, who had been murdered by the Nazis. A circular plaza fronting the entrance was also created in 1983.

== Events ==
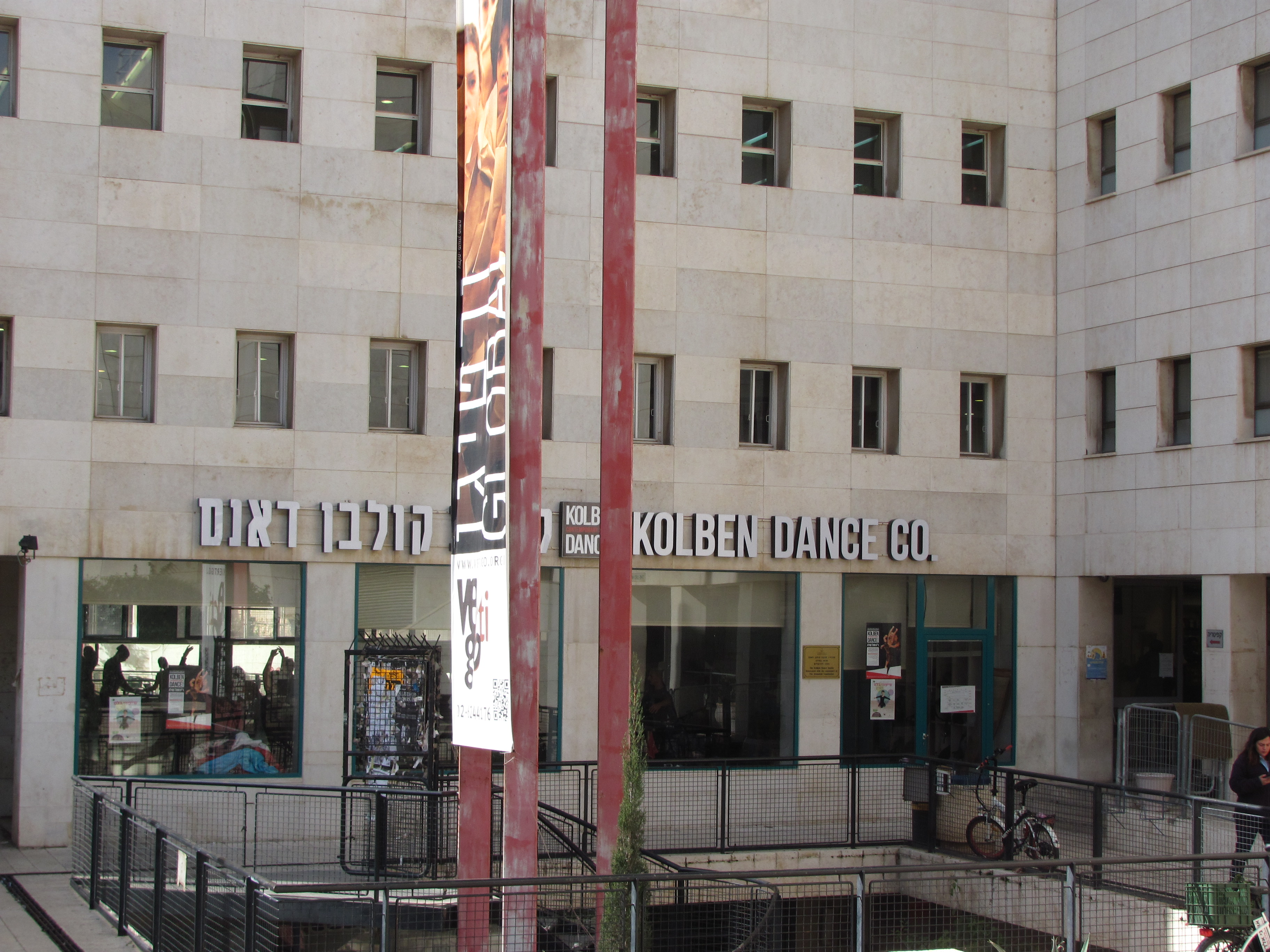
Kolben Dance Studio

The Gerard Behar Center hosts theatre, music, and dance performances; folk dancing; ethnic shows; Russian-, French-, and Arabic-language shows; plays; comedy shows; and children's performances. From time to time it works with other bodies to stage independent productions, such as a "Hot Jazz Series" which brings together the "best musicians" from Israel and abroad to perform "jazz, salsa, classical, Latin, African and Jewish music". The all-female Theatre Company Jerusalem has staged the world premiere of several works at the Center, including the 1992 Israeli-Palestinian play The Jasmine Bush and the 2000 play Sota. The Center is the home of two dance companies, Vertigo and Kolben.

The Center is the site for events held in conjunction with the Israel Festival, the Jerusalem Arts Festival, and Holocaust Remembrance Day. On the latter holiday, a free "Singing and Remembering" event combines performances by singers and songwriters with audience participation, as attendees are encouraged to "share stories about their personal connection to the Holocaust". The Center is also the venue for the annual Rabbi Shlomo Carlebach Memorial Concert, the Machol Shalem (Whole Dance) Festival, and the Hullegeb Israeli Ethiopian Arts Festival.

Tens of thousands of K–12 students visit the Gerard Behar Center each school year as part of the government's "Cultural Basket" program (Hebrew: אומנות לעם, Omanut La'Am), which mandates student attendance at "performances, art films and/or art exhibitions five or six times a year as part of their curriculum"; these activities are subsidized and transportation is provided. The Israel Broadcasting Authority sponsors an annual Competition for Young Artists in which musicians aged 18 to 30 compete for scholarships and the Gerard Behar Grand Prize.

The Center hosts workshops by artists from the United States and England, and exhibitions of art and photography primarily by local artists. Lectures, seminars, conferences, and gatherings of organizations, institutions, and government offices round out the annual calendar of events.

According to the 2006 Jerusalem Foundation report, both theatres in the Gerard Behar Center "are nearly always filled to capacity for events". In calendar year 2010, there were approximately 63,300 attendees at theatrical performances, 31,800 attendees at dance and musical performances, and 36,100 children attending "Cultural Basket" events. The Center hosted over 900 events in 2010, with attendance in excess of 263,600 participants.

Notwithstanding its prominence, the Center has a permanent staff of only four: a director-general, a secretary, a technician, and a ticket sales manager. Outside staff is brought in to produce large events.

== Other activities ==
The seven-story building adjoining the Gerard Behar Center contains an adult and youth reading library, an adult education program known as the Popular University, and Ulpan Beit Ha'Am, the largest and oldest Hebrew-language ulpan (language immersion course) in Jerusalem. The ulpan, operated by the Jerusalem Municipality, offers courses for new immigrants, tourists, and retirees, and conducts field trips to acquaint new immigrants with Israel. A dance/exercise studio is on the ground floor of the building. In 1987 the Jerusalem Foundation incorporated the Gerard Behar theatre complex, the Beit Ha'Am educational and library facilities, and the dance studio into a larger public complex known as the Jacob & Hilda Blaustein Civic Center.

== Mural ==
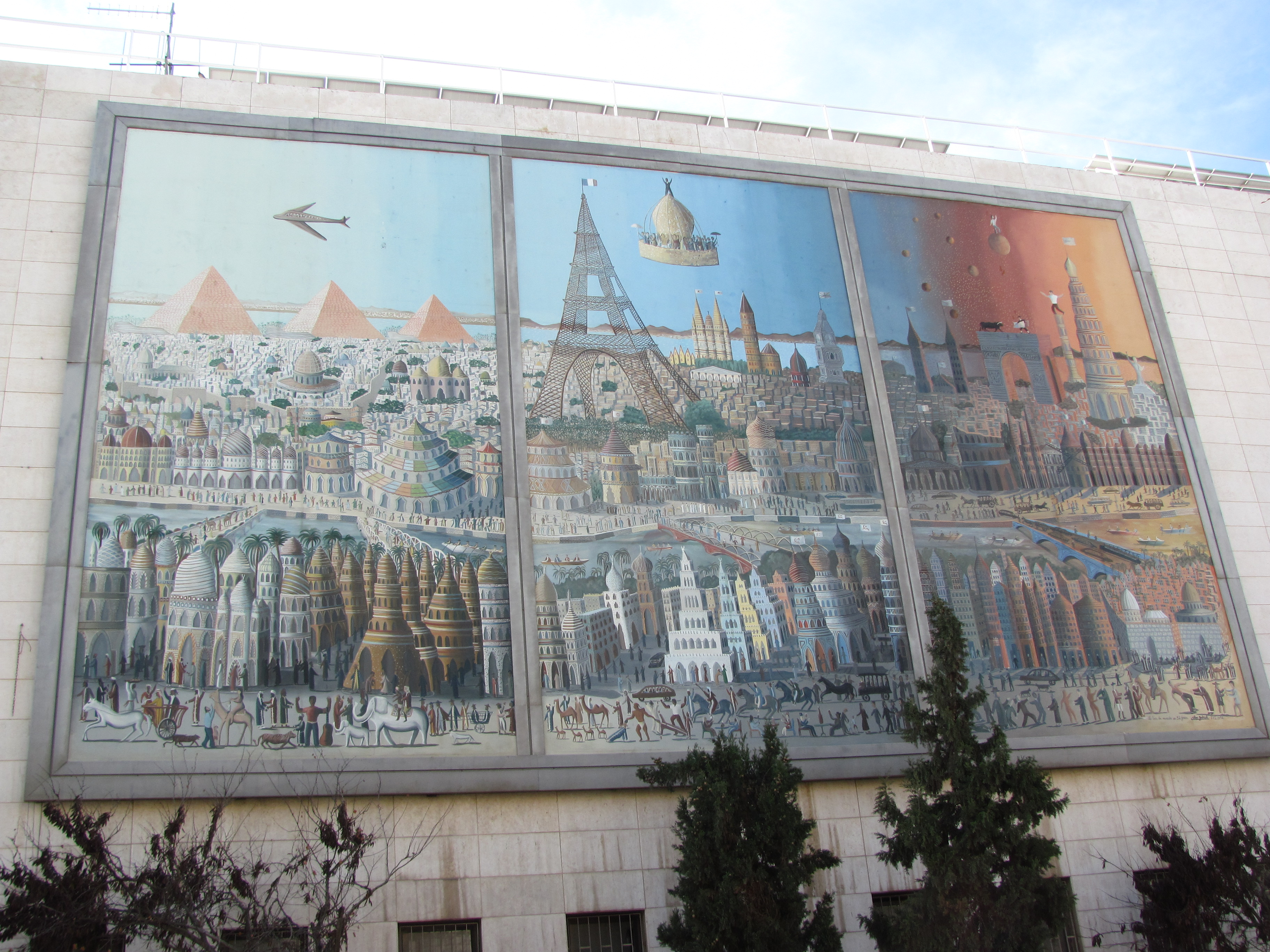
Mural on the Gerard Behar Center

The northern façade of the Gerard Behar Center, facing Bezalel Street, features a 160-square-metre (1,700 sq ft) mural titled "Around the World in 92 Days". The triptych painting is a large-scale reproduction of a 1976 painting by Jerusalem artist Gabriel Cohen; the original is housed in the Israel Museum. Painted in naïve art style, the painting depicts world landmarks such as the Eiffel Tower and Arc de Triomphe in Paris, the Walls of Jerusalem and the Dome of the Rock in Jerusalem, the pyramids of Egypt, the Leaning Tower of Pisa, bridges in London, and sights in India, with people and animals of all kinds walking along the streets and bridges below. The mural was produced by Cité de la Creation, which painted five trompe-l'œil murals in downtown Jerusalem. On the sidewalk across the street from the mural stand five small pillars topped with engraved metal plates describing the work in Hebrew and English, and depicting reproductions of different parts of the painting for visually-handicapped persons, with explanations in Braille.
