= Lvovo =

Lvovo may refer to:

- L'vovo Derrango, a South African Kwaito singer; see Zakes Bantwini § L'vovo Derrango
- Lvovo, Tambov Oblast, a village (selo) in Tambov Oblast, Russia
- L'vovo, Moscow Oblast

== See also ==
- Lev (disambiguation)
- Lvov (disambiguation)
- Lvovsky (disambiguation)
- L'vove, Kherson Oblast (spelled "L'vovo" in Russian); see Pyotr Solodukhin § Final command and death
