= Lviv Stadium =

Lviv Stadium may refer to:

- Arena Lviv, a football stadium opened in 2011 in Lviv, Ukraine, and home of FC Lviv and Rukh Lviv
- Ukraina Stadium, a stadium opened in 1963 and mainly used as the home of FC Karpaty Lviv

== See also ==
- Lviv (disambiguation)
