= Martyringa ussuriella =

Scientific classification
- Kingdom: Animalia
- Phylum: Arthropoda
- Clade: Pancrustacea
- Class: Insecta
- Order: Lepidoptera
- Family: Lecithoceridae
- Genus: Martyringa
- Species: M. ussuriella

Binomial name
- Martyringa ussuriella Lvovsky, 1979

Synonyms
- Martyringa ussuriella kurilensis Lvovsky, 1979

Species of moth

Martyringa ussuriella is a moth in the family Lecithoceridae. It was described by Alexandr L. Lvovsky in 1979. It is found in Russia (Ussuri) and Japan.
