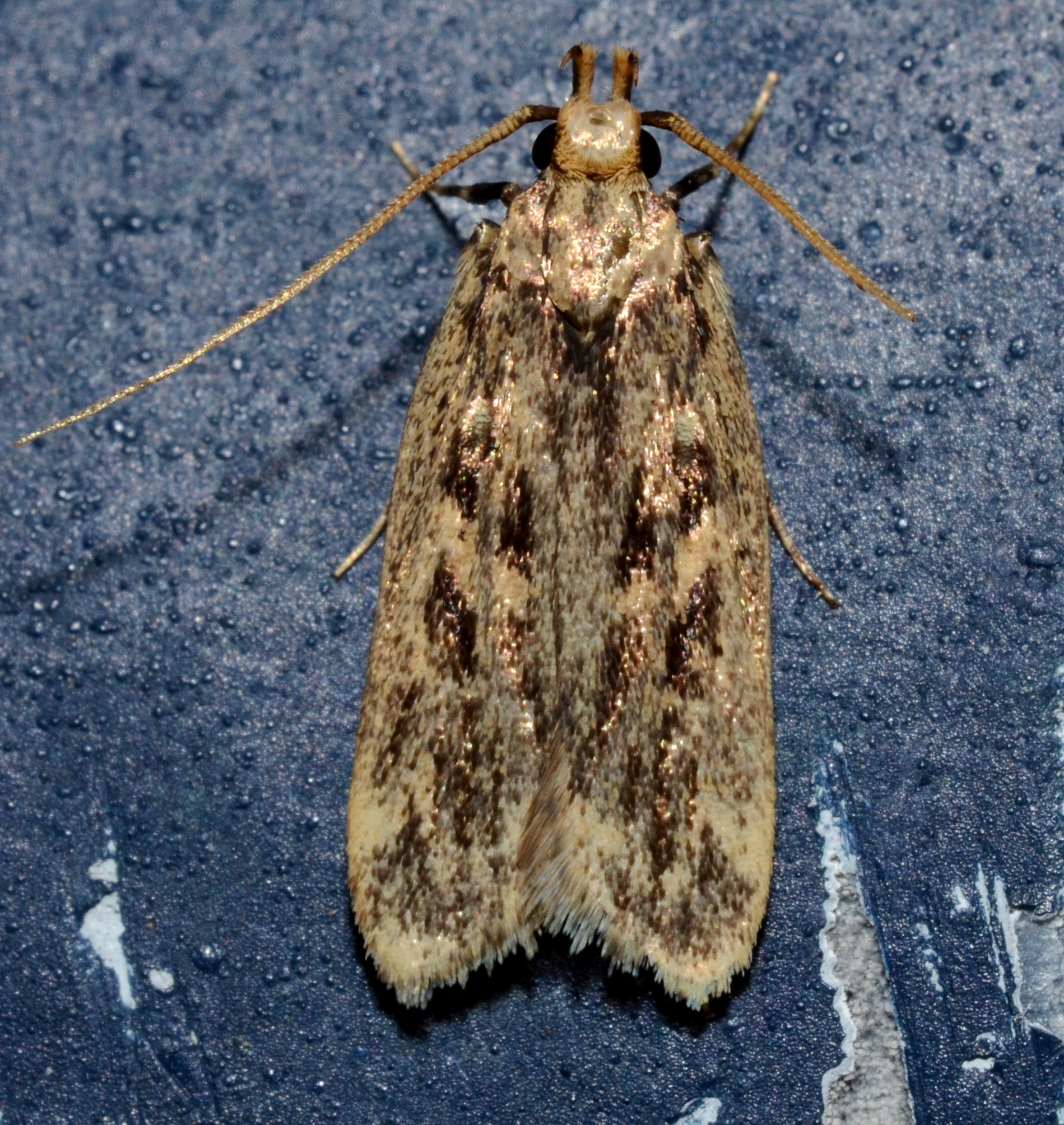
- Martyringa latipennis

Scientific classification
- Domain: Eukaryota
- Kingdom: Animalia
- Phylum: Arthropoda
- Class: Insecta
- Order: Lepidoptera
- Family: Lecithoceridae
- Genus: Martyringa; Busck, 1902

Species
- See text

Synonyms
- Anchonoma Meyrick, 1910; Santuzza Heinrich, 1920

= Martyringa =

Genus of moths

Martyringa is a genus of moths of the family Lecithoceridae.

== Species ==
- Martyringa hoenei Lvovsky, 2010
- Martyringa latipennis (Walsingham, 1882)
- Martyringa ussuriella Lvovsky, 1979
- Martyringa xeraula (Meyrick, 1910)
