= Lev (surname) =

Lev is a surname. Notable people with the surname include:

== People ==
- Elena Lev (born 1981), Cirque du Soleil performer
- Gabriella Lev, theatre director, writer and performer
- Jakub Lev (born 1990), Czech ice hockey player
- Jaroslav Lev of Rožmitál (c. 1425–1486), Bohemian nobleman
- Jiri Lev, Australian architect
- Nadya Lev, Russian-American photographer, editor, publisher, designer and entrepreneur
- Ray Lev (1912–1968), American classical pianist
- Sam Lev, Israeli bridge player
- Shimon Lev (born 1962), Israeli multidisciplinary artist, writer, photographer, curator and researcher
- Zdeněk Lev of Rožmitál (c. 1470–1535), Bohemian nobleman
- Ze'ev Lev (1922–2004), born William Low, Israeli physicist, Torah scholar and founder of the Jerusalem College of Technology

== Fictional characters ==
- Asher Lev, protagonist of two Chaim Potok novels: My Name Is Asher Lev and The Gift of Asher Lev
