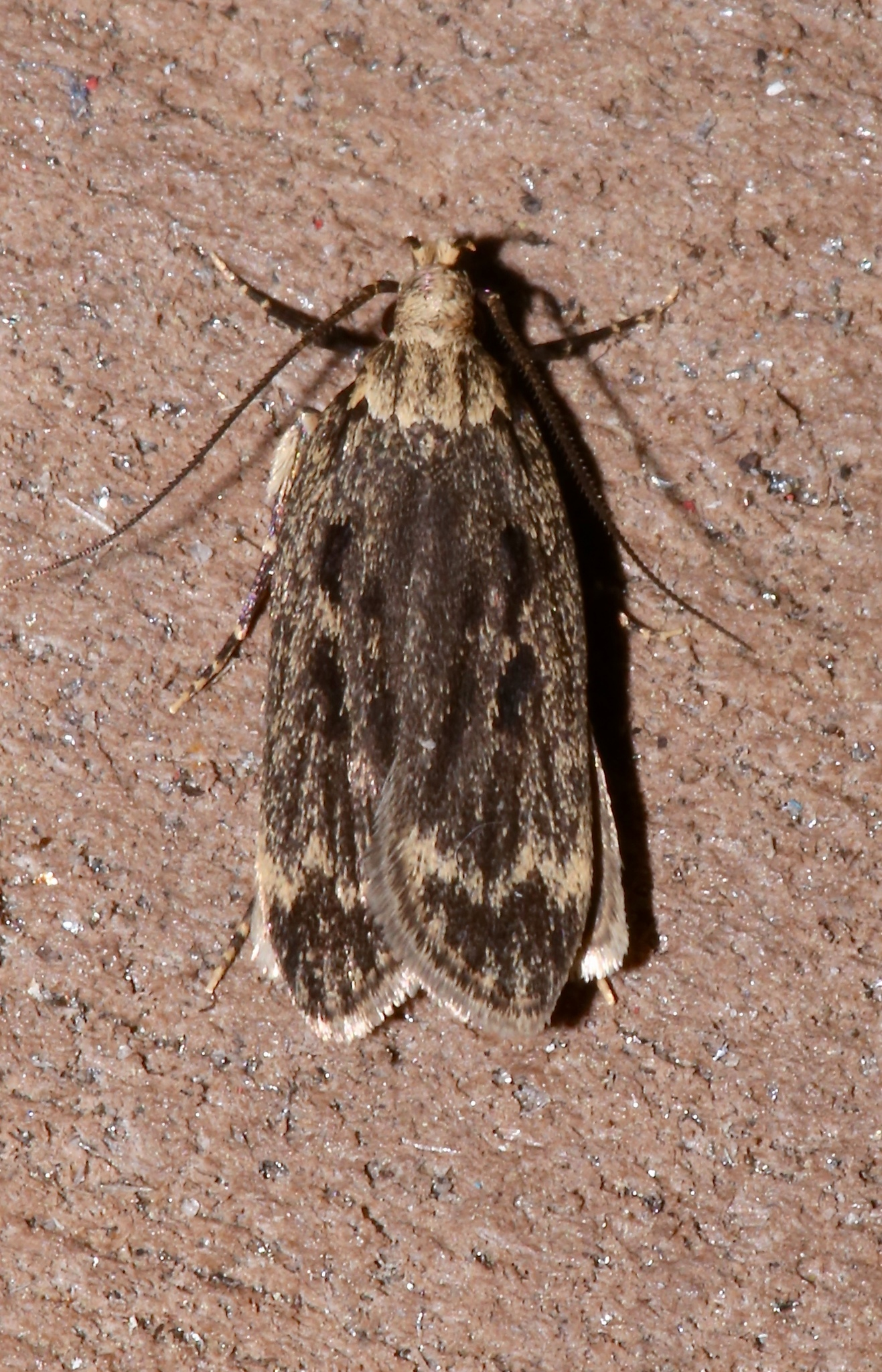

Scientific classification
- Kingdom: Animalia
- Phylum: Arthropoda
- Class: Insecta
- Order: Lepidoptera
- Family: Lecithoceridae
- Genus: Martyringa
- Species: M. xeraula

Binomial name
- Martyringa xeraula (Meyrick, 1910)

Synonyms
- Anchonoma xeraula Meyrick, 1910; Santuzza kuwani Heinrich, 1920; Martyringa kuwanii; Martyringa ravicapitis Hodges, 1960

= Martyringa xeraula =

Species of moth

Martyringa xeraula, the Himalayan grain moth, is a moth in the family Lecithoceridae. It was described by Edward Meyrick in 1910. It is found in India (Assam), western China, Japan and North America, where it has been recorded from Louisiana, Texas and from Florida to South Carolina.

The wingspan is 21–28 mm. The forewings are pale greyish ochreous, suffusedly irrorated (sprinkled) with dark fuscous and with a small spot of dark fuscous suffusion on the base of the costa. The stigmata are cloudy and dark fuscous, the first discal somewhat elongate, the plical hardly beyond it, the second discal approximated, in the middle of the wing. There is a cloudy pale subterminal line, sharply indented beneath the costa, edged posteriorly with dark fuscous suffusion. The hindwings are light grey, paler and somewhat ochreous tinged anteriorly.

The larvae feed on detritus.
