= Lviv (disambiguation) =

Lviv is a city in the eponymous raion of the eponymous oblast in Western Ukraine.

Lviv may also refer to:

== Places ==
- Lviv Raion, Lviv Oblast, Ukraine
- Lviv Oblast, Ukraine
- Lviv railway station, Lviv, Ukraine
- Arena Lviv, Lviv, Ukraine; a soccer stadium

== Groups, companies, organizations ==
- FC Lviv, Lviv, Ukraine; a soccer team
- Lviv Airlines
- Lviv Railways

== See also ==
- Lwów (disambiguation)
- Lvov (disambiguation)
- Lemberg (disambiguation)
- Battle of Lviv (disambiguation)
