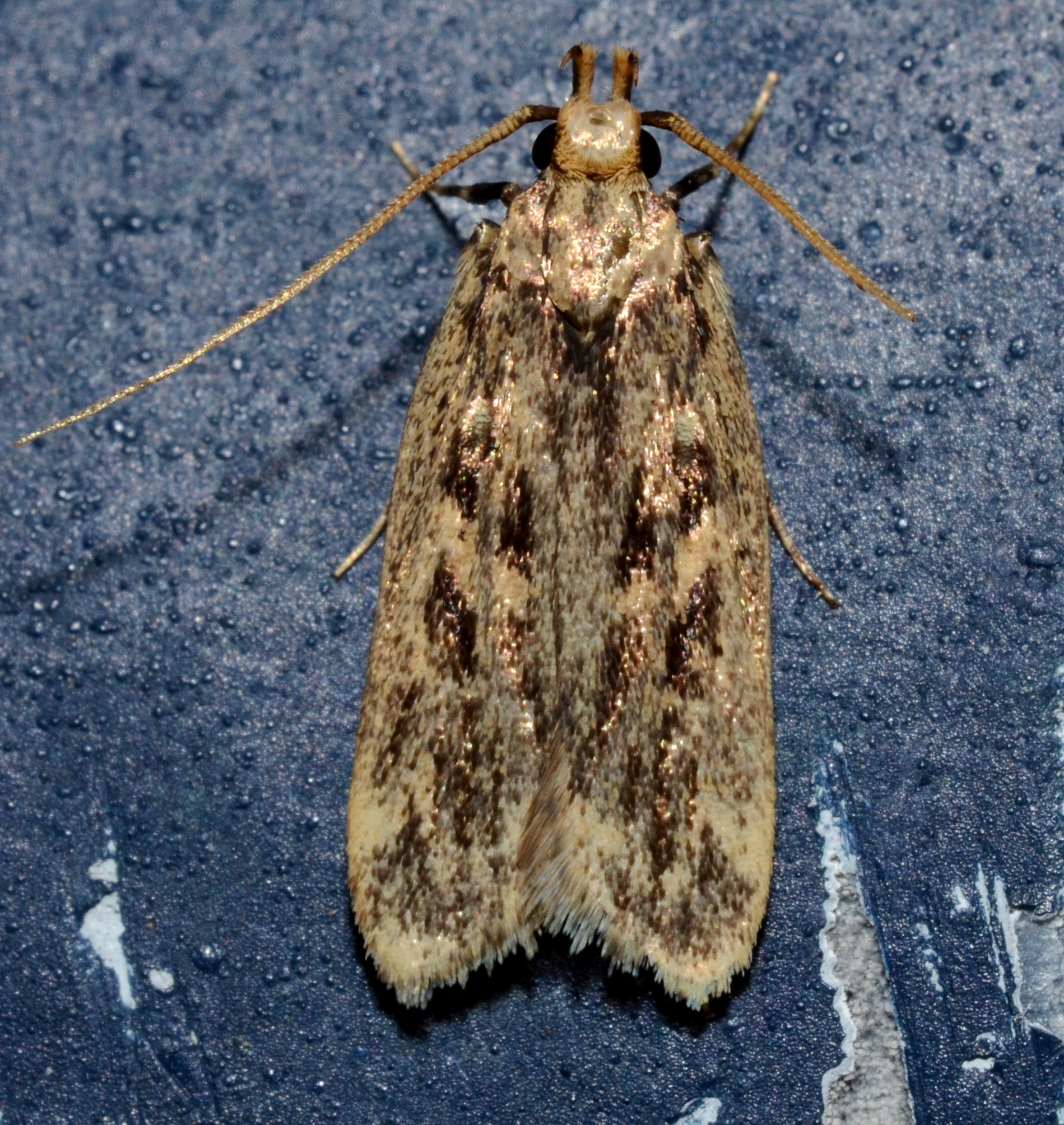

Scientific classification
- Domain: Eukaryota
- Kingdom: Animalia
- Phylum: Arthropoda
- Class: Insecta
- Order: Lepidoptera
- Family: Lecithoceridae
- Genus: Martyringa
- Species: M. latipennis

Binomial name
- Martyringa latipennis (Walsingham, 1882)

Synonyms
- Oegoconia latipennis Meyrick, 1888

= Martyringa latipennis =

Species of moth

Martyringa latipennis is a moth of the family Lecithoceridae. It is found in North America, where it has been recorded in Alabama, Arkansas, Georgia, Illinois, Indiana, Kentucky, Maine, Maryland, Massachusetts, New Hampshire, North Carolina, Ohio, Pennsylvania, South Carolina, Tennessee, Virginia and West Virginia.

Their wingspan is 15–21 mm. The forewings are pale ochreous, much suffused and irregularly clouded with brownish fuscous, which occupies the whole of the costal and apical portions of the wing, except a pale fascia, commencing at the costal cilia, turning outwards at a right angle at the apex of the cell, then again, downwards to the anal angle. The apical margin and the dorsal half of the wing are also chiefly pale ochreous, enclosing one plical and two discal diffused brownish-fuscous spots, of which the outer one near the end of the cell is the most conspicuous. The hindwings are very pale cinereous. Adults are on wing from May to August.
