= Margaret Jenkins =

American choreographer (born 1942)

Margaret Jenkins (born 1942) is a postmodern choreographer based in San Francisco, California. She was a Guggenheim Fellow in 1980 and in 2003, San Francisco mayor, Willie Brown, declared April 24 to be Margaret Jenkins Day.

== Biography ==
Jenkins began her early training in dance in her hometown of San Francisco with Judy and Lenore Job, Welland Lathrop, and Gloria Unti. She continued her dance studies at the Juilliard School and the University of California at Los Angeles. During the 1960s she returned to New York and danced with Jack Moore, Viola Farber, Judy Dunn, James Cunningham, Gus Solomons Jr. and Twyla Tharp's original company with Sara Rudner. Additionally, In addition, Jenkins was a member of the faculty of the Merce Cunningham Studio for 12 years and in that time restaged his works throughout the United States and Europe. In 1967, Merce Cunningham asked Ms. Jenkins to re stage his work for the Cullberg Ballet in Stockholm, Sweden, one of the first times his work was performed by another company.

In 1970, Jenkins returned to San Francisco, where she taught dance and choreographed. She founded the Margaret Jenkins Dance Company in 1973. The company is based in San Francisco and tours both nationally and internationally. Several of Jenkins' company members have gone on to form their own dance companies. These include Elizabeth Streb, Joe Goode, and Kathleen Hermesdorf. Additionally, Jenkins opened one of the first spaces in the city to combine creative research, choreography, and performance in the same building. Currently, the Margaret Jenkins Dance Company is housed in the newly established Margaret Jenkins Dance Lab, located in the South of Market Street district of San Francisco. In 2004, Jenkins and her company established the Choreographers in Mentorship Exchange (CHIME) with support from the James Irving Foundation. This program develops connections and long-term relationships between emerging and established choreographers. Choreographers who participate in CHIME are provided with time in the studio and artist fees.

Jenkins is considered a "West Coast modern dance innovator". In creating her work, she is interested in collaborating with artists from different fields. She has worked with the poet Michael Palmer, and the visual designer Alexander Nichols. She has also collaborated with musicians, including the Kronos Quartet and the Paul Dresher Ensemble. While in New York, she was influenced by many of the experimental artists of the 1960s. These included dancers and choreographers Merce Cunningham, Trisha Brown, David Gordon, Yvonne Rainer, and Steve Paxton. She was also inspired by musicians John Cage, Morton Feldman, and Earle Brown. She admired the work of visual artists Robert Rauschenberg, Jasper Johns, and Andy Warhol . Her work has been well received by critics. The New York Times considers Jenkins’ work to be hauntingly beautiful and compelling dance...astonishing. Additionally, the Washington Post described her choreography as having intelligence, force, and imagination.

== Choreography ==
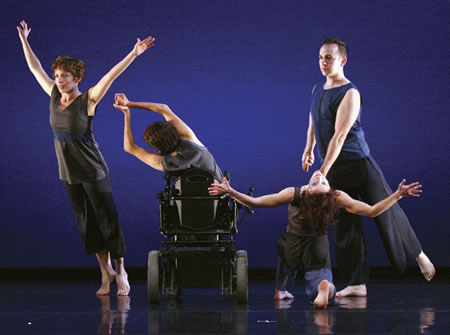
The AXIS Dance Company performs Waypoint by Margaret Jenkins. From left to right are dancers Margaret Cromwell, Bonnie Lewkowicz, Sonsherée Giles, and Sean McMahon.

In the last four decades, she has had over 80 works created on her Company, as well as resident companies in the United States, Asia and Europe. Jenkins has received commissions from national and international arts presenters and cultural institutions, including the Clarice Smith Center for the Performing Arts at the University of Maryland, Yerba Buena Center for the Arts (YBCA), the de Young Museum in San Francisco, The Dance Center of Columbia College in Chicago, National Dance Project (NDP), Krannert Center for the Performing Arts, Arizona State University, University of Arizona, New Dance Ensemble in Minneapolis, Repertory Dance Theatre in Salt Lake City, Oakland Ballet, Cullberg Ballet of Sweden, and Ginko, a modern dance company in Tokyo, Japan. In addition, she has set work on dancers within various college and university dance departments. In 2008, Jenkins was commissioned to create a new work for the 75th anniversary of the San Francisco Ballet, one of two women with this distinct honor.

Over the two decades, Ms. Jenkins’ choreographic attention has been focused on cross-cultural collaborations between her Company and international artists, including the Tanusree Shankar Dance Company of India, and the Guangdong Modern Dance Company of China, Ginko in Japan, and the Kolben Dance Company in Jerusalem, Israel. She has also developed ambitious multi-disciplinary works such as Light Moves, an evening-length dance created in collaboration with media artist Naomie Kremer. A proponent of a fully realized collaborative art, Jenkins has worked with Terry Allen, Alvin Curran, Paul Dresher, Rinde Eckert, David Lang, Bruce Nauman, Naomie Kremer, Alexander V. Nichols, Yoko Ono and others from the fields of dance, music and visual arts. In 2013, Jenkins and her Company traveled to Israel for a month-long residency with the Kolben Dance Company of Jerusalem to collaborate on a new work that premiered during the MJDC's 40th Anniversary Season. Soon after the MJDC returned to Jerusalem for its premiere there.

After the completion of her 40th anniversary season, she reinvented a way to move forward with a more flexible, affordable, touring model with the work Site Series (Inside Outside), creating a work for people's living rooms, galleries, museums, parks – any unconventional space.

For her 43rd season, Ms. Jenkins and her Company premiered Skies Calling Skies Falling and a reimagined Site Series for the Wilsey Center in the War Memorial Building in San Francisco. Site Series was viewed in the Education Studio from 4 sides, up close and personal. Skies Calling Skies Falling was seen in the Atrium Theater in a more traditional seating environment. There was an 8-minute video by video artists by David and Hi-Jin Hodge that preceded the live dancing filmed in a granary in San Francisco. Additional collaborators were Michael Palmer – poet, Thomas Carnacki - music, David Robertson - lighting design and Mary Domenico – costumes.

== Accomplishments ==
As an organizer and enthusiast for dance, Jenkins served as Artistic Consultant to Dance About, a dance facility at the UC Berkeley Extension in San Francisco; sat on the steering committee for the 2002 International Women's Day Conference in San Francisco; and facilitated a showcase for presenters to be introduced to the work of Swedish choreographers in Stockholm. She was a founding member of the Bay Area Dance Coalition and of Dance/USA, serving on its first Board of Directors. She was on the Board of Directors of Yerba Buena Center for the Arts in San Francisco for six years. She remains an active participant on panels across the United States.

In addition, Jenkins conceived The National Dance Lab (NDL) a “product-driven,” as opposed to “market-driven,” model for creativity in the performing arts. Jenkins has also helped to structure and implement Choreographers in Action (CIA), a unique gathering of Bay Area choreographers who, in combination and collaboration, posit solutions to the myriad of issues that surround the working artist. Similarly, Jenkins was one of the founding members of the Center for Creative Research (CCR) based in New York, which was a collection of eleven senior choreographers who came together under the leadership of Sam Miller and Dana Whitco to create artistic research residencies within universities. She was on the first board of directors of Dance USA and served on the board of YBCA for six years.

In 2014, SFGate claimed that "Few modern dance companies in the Bay Area have survived as long as the Margaret Jenkins Dance Company." It went on to say that even fewer have continued to be as innovative as her dance company.

== Awards ==
Jenkins has received numerous awards, including a Guggenheim Fellowship (1980), an Irvine Fellowship in Dance, the San Francisco Arts Commission Award of Honor, three Isadora Duncan Dance Awards (Izzies), and the Bernard Osher Cultural Award for her outstanding contributions to the arts community in San Francisco and the Bay Area and 2015 a Sustained Achievement Award from the Izzies. April 24, 2003 was declared “Margaret Jenkins Day” by San Francisco Mayor Willie Brown. On that day, she also received a Governor's Commendation from Governor Gray Davis. In 2013, she was awarded a residency at The Rockefeller Foundation Bellagio Center in Italy.
