= Naomie Kremer =

Israeli-born American painter (born 1953)

Naomie Kremer (Hebrew: נעמי קרמר; born January 31, 1953) is an Israeli-born American artist living and working in Berkeley, CA, and Paris, France. Kremer works in paint, video, photography, digital projection, and stage design.

== Early life and education ==
Kremer is one of two children, born in Tel Aviv, Israel, to Yitzhak and Dora Tarshish. When Kremer was 8 years old, her family immigrated to Brooklyn, New York (NY), from Israel. Kremer began drawing at the age of 10 and later took classes at the Brooklyn Museum in life drawing.

After high school Kremer attended the University of Rochester, NY and minored in Art. In 1973, Kremer met her husband, Charles Kremer, in India and they moved to London, England. Kremer went to Sussex University in Brighton where she earned a master's degree in Art History, specializing in Modern and Contemporary art, with a thesis on Abstract Expressionism. In 1977, Kremer and her husband moved to the United States and settled in the San Francisco Bay Area. Kremer worked as a graphic designer until 1989. In 1991, Kremer went back to school for a master's degree in Painting and Drawing at California College of the Arts (CCA). After completing her second master's degree, Kremer began teaching painting and drawing at CCA and the San Francisco Art Institute and working as a full-time professional artist.

== Artistic career ==
Kremer is known for paintings that incorporate video and digital projection, and her work in set design for the performing arts. In 2008, she was commissioned by Berkeley Opera to create a video-based set for Béla Bartók’s Bluebeard’s Castle. In 2011, she collaborated with Margaret Jenkins Dance Company to create a video-based set for the performance Light Moves, which premiered at Yerba Buena Center for the Arts and was subsequently performed at the Clarice Smith Center for the Performing Arts at the University of Maryland and the Dance Center at Columbia College in Chicago. In 2012, Kremer was commissioned to create a video-based set design for the world premiere opera based on The Secret Garden, co-commissioned by San Francisco Opera and Cal Performances, with music by Nolan Gasser and libretto by Carey Harrison. In 2016, she was commissioned to create a video-based set for Alcina, by GF Handel, performed in the Crusader’s Courtyard in Acre, Israel, by French baroque orchestra Les Talens Lyriques. In 2017, she created a video set for Lucia Berlin: Stories—Five stories from Berlin’s posthumous publication A Manual for Cleaning Women, directed by Nancy Shelby and JoAnne Winter with an original jazz score by Marcus Shelby. It was performed by Word for Word at Z Below, San Francisco, Theatre de la Tour Eiffel, Paris, and theaters in Nancy and Angers, France. In 2018, she was commissioned by the Claude Heater Foundation to design a video backdrop for Richard Wagner’s Tristan and Isolde, premiering at the Herbst Theater in SF, and subsequently performed in Luslawice, Poland, at the Krzysztof Penderecki European Centre for Music. In 2019, Kremer was commissioned by the Paul Dresher Ensemble to create a video backdrop for Dresher/Davel Duo world premiere of 342.

Kremer’s work has been exhibited in institutions and galleries including the Beijing Museum of Contemporary Art, Berkeley Art Museum and Pacific Film Archive, Contemporary Jewish Museum, SF, Magnes Museum in Berkeley, CA, Oakland Museum of California, SFMOMA Artist Gallery, San Jose Institute of Contemporary Art, and Yerba Buena Center for the Arts. Her work resides in corporate and museum collections including the Fine Arts Museums of San Francisco, Achenbach Foundation for Graphic Arts, Hammer Museum, UCLA, SFMOMA, New York Public Library, Tang Museum, the Brooklyn Museum, and Arkansas Art Center, Little Rock, AR.

Art Critic Kenneth Baker has said of Kremer's work: “Naomie Kremer’s improvisational works depend on elusive, harmonious relations among painterly details, the tempo of brushwork, and the dimensions of a canvas.”

In a review about Kremer's show Age of Entanglement at the San Jose Institute of Contemporary Art, art critic David Roth said: “Populated by layers of colliding shapes, colors and gestures, they pushed the non-objective impulse to its outer limits, harnessing what felt like primordial forces.”

Kremer works as a professional artist out of her studio in Oakland, CA and shows internationally. She is represented by Modernism, Inc. in San Francisco, and Von Fraunberg Gallery in Düsseldorf, Germany.
