= Lemberg (Affalterbach) =

Hill in Baden-Württemberg, Germany

Coordinates: 48°55′05″N 9°18′31″E

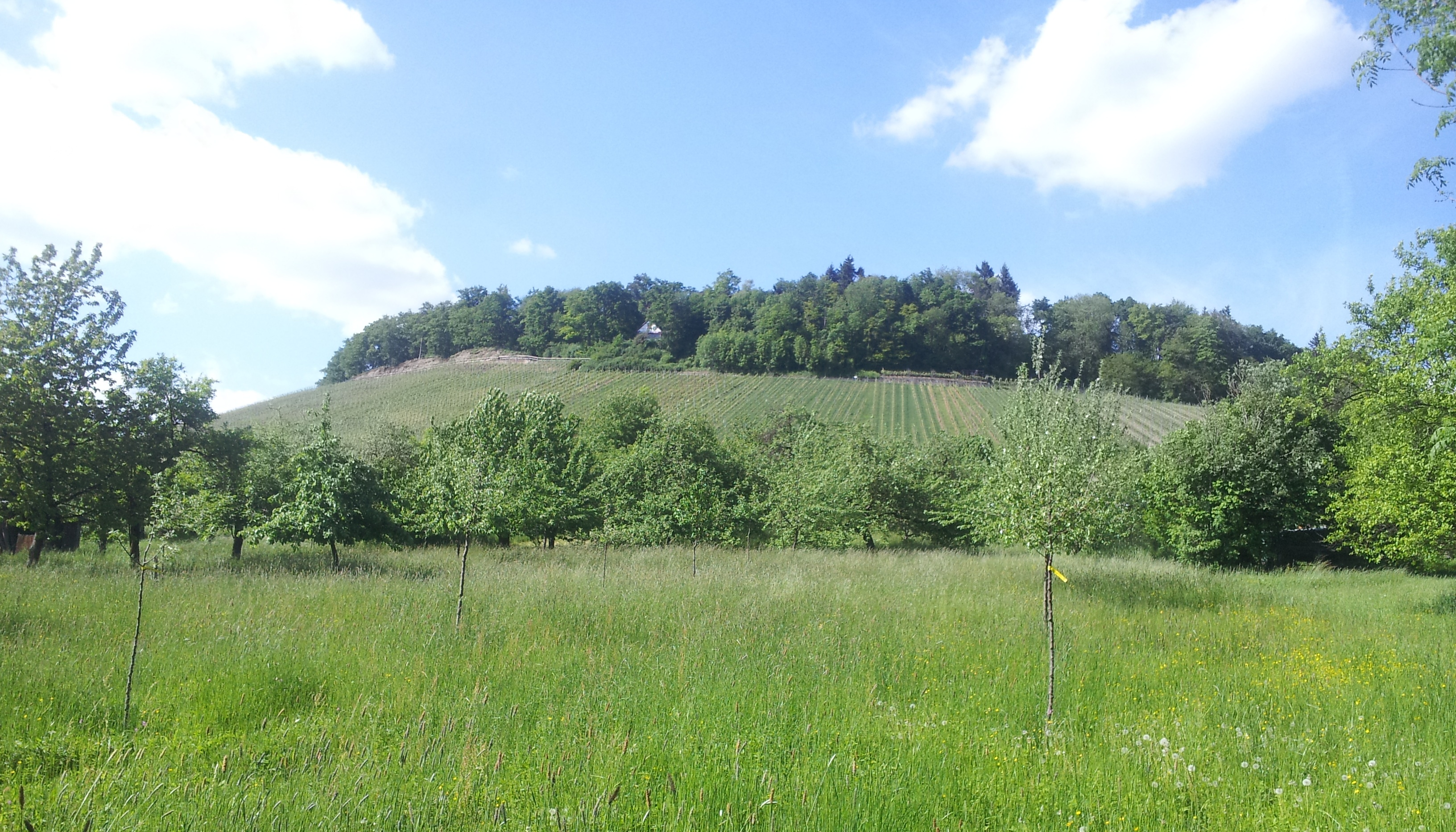

Highest point
- Elevation: 365 m (1,198 ft)

Geography
- Location: Baden-Württemberg, Germany

Lemberg (Affalterbach) is a hill, 365 metres high, in Baden-Württemberg, Germany.
