= Kolben Dance Company =

Kolben Dance is an Israeli modern dance company. It was founded by Amir Kolben in Jerusalem in 1996. When the company was founded, it was called "Kombina", until 2006 when the name was changed to "Kolben Dance".

In 2014, Kolben Dance company collaborated with Margaret Jenkins's dance company in a joint piece called "The Gate of Winds". The rehearsing for the piece took 10 weeks, during the rehearsal period, Jenkins and her dancers came to Jerusalem for 5 weeks, and then Kolben and his dancers went to San Francisco for 5 weeks. The piece was first performed in San Francisco as part of the 40th anniversary celebrations of Margaret Jenkins's dance company.

== Works ==
- Gates of Jerusalem (2010)
- Babel (Babylon) by Amir Kolben (2011)
- Kmehin (Truffle) by Amir Kolben (2013)
- Charlie Mandelbaum by Amir Kolben (2014)
- The Gate of Winds by Amir Kolben and Margaret Jenkins (2014)
- Who Took My Cheese? by Amir Kolben (2015)
- Chai Beseret (Living in a Movie) by Amir Kolben (2015)
- Steven was Wrong by Rachel Erdos (2015)
- Memorandom by Amir Kolben (2016)
- Al Hakaze (On the Edge) by Amir Kolben (2018)
- Hashtika (The Silence) by Amir Kolben (2019)
- Orfaus by Amir Kolben (2019)
- The Snow Queen by Amir Kolben (2019)
- Lehudim by Amir Kolben (2021)
- Agam 3.0 (Lake 3.0) by Amir Kolben (2023)
- kakha by Amir Kolben (2023)
- Lihok (Casting) by Noa Tzuk (2024)
- Eddie by Amir Kolben (2024)
- Siporey Savta (Grandma Stories) by Amir Kolben (2024)
- Blue Sun by Amir Kolben (2026)

== Culture ==
In 2011, the company, based in Jerusalem, decided to stop covering its windows during rehearsals. The windows initially were covered by the requests of religious individuals and groups who lived near the studio. However, after the dancers and the company kept getting harassed despite covering the windows, they made a decision to stop doing so.

== See Also ==
- Culture of Israel
