= Lvovsky, Moscow Oblast =

Lvovsky Львовский
- Urban-type settlement
- Location within Moscow Oblast Location within Russia
- Coordinates: 55°18′50″N 37°31′20″E
- Country: Russia
- Region: Moscow Oblast
- District: Podolsky District
- Time zone: UTC+3:00

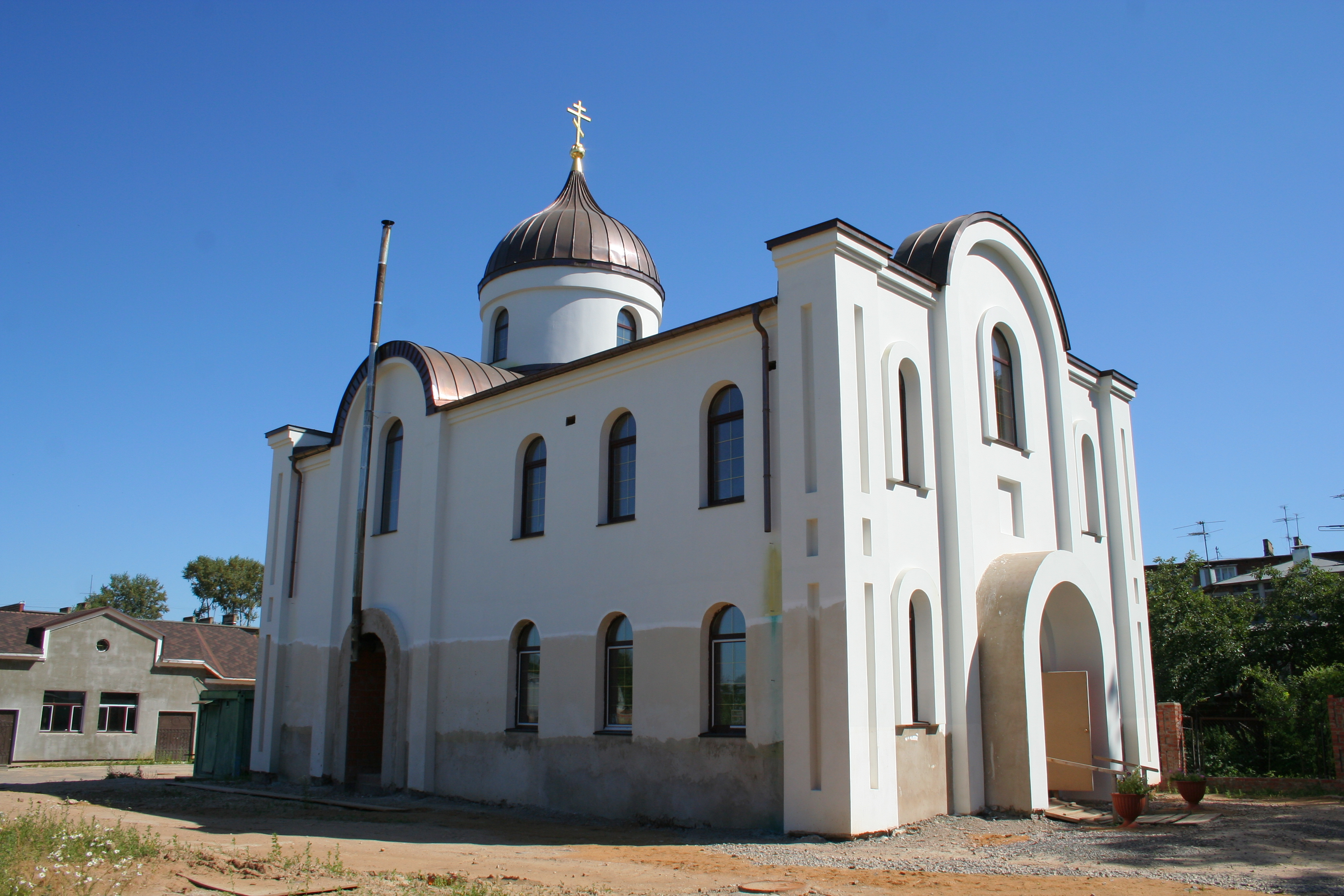
A church photo

Lvovsky (Russian: Львовский) is an urban locality (an urban-type settlement) of the city of Podolsk and formerly in Podolsky District, Moscow Oblast, Russia. Population: 10,855 (2010 census); 11,906 (2002 census); 12,858 (1989 Soviet census).
