= Lemberg (Stuttgart) =

Mountain in Stuttgart, Germany

Coordinates: 48°49′01″N 9°07′56″E

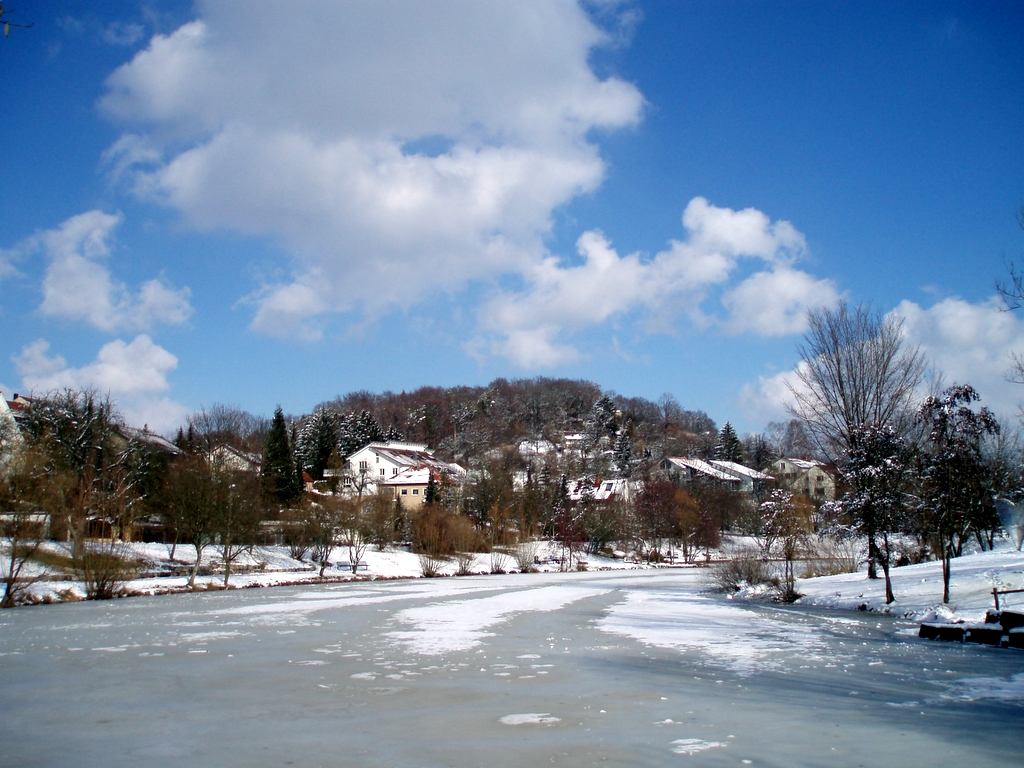

Highest point
- Elevation: 384 m (1,260 ft)

Geography
- Location: Baden-Württemberg, Germany

Lemberg (Stuttgart) is a hill, 384 metres high, in Baden-Württemberg, Germany.
