= Theatre Company Jerusalem =

Theatre Company Jerusalem (TCJ) fuses contemporary performing arts with ancient Hebrew and Aramaic writings to create theatre.

Gabriella Lev, artistic director and co-founder initiated the formation of the company in 1982 to release the silenced voice of women within Jewish tradition. She was joined by fellow artists Aliza Elion-Israeli, Ruth Wieder-Magan and Joyce Miller. Their vision of forging a theatre which is reflective of Jerusalem's cultural and geographical context, grounded in Jewish texts and employing new forms and techniques of theatrical expression is forever coming into being. Theatre Company Jerusalem (TCJ) also performs and teaches throughout Israel and the world, in both English and Hebrew.

TCJ has created 36 original theatrical and musical works – see list below.

== Theatrical influences and techniques ==
TCJ performs Talmudic and Midrashic stories. Major artistic influences in their works were director Jerzy Grotowski's work with Serge Ouaknine (a pupil of Grotowski), Andre Gregory and The Roy Hart Theatre.

=== Midrash performance ===
- The Hebrew term Midrash (Hebrew: מדרש; plural midrashim, "story" from "to investigate" or "study") is a homiletic method of biblical exegesis. The term also refers to the whole compilation of homiletic teachings on the Bible. Midrash is a way of interpreting biblical stories that goes beyond simple distillation of religious, legal or moral teachings. It fills in many gaps left in the biblical narrative regarding events and personalities that are only hinted at.
- The Hebrew word Bama has three meanings: 1) a stage on which a theatrical creation is presented 2) The raised area in a synagogue on which there is a table. This table is used to lay The Torah Scroll on, in order that the reader can read aloud the weekly portion from the Bible, 3) In ancient times, the plural of the word bama, bimot, signified raised areas of ritual which included an altar and some kind of sculpture.

In “midrash Bama” the tern coined by the company, it is explained that the practice of 'Midrash bama' is throwing new light on the meaning of ancient texts by their transformation from the medium of the written word to the stage and performance

Midrash performance uses the whole range of the human capability in art, to convey a meaning that only becomes fully apparent when placed in front of an audience. The performer, must have a highly trained body and voice, and spend many years refining and making the flexible connection between feeling, thought, psychic life and physical action. Thus on stage, they can interpret the midrash in its original language, using different tones of voice and singing, dance and movement and the particular juxtaposition of all these different human elements. It is the interpretation of the language, and the real-time encounter with the audience which gives birth to a particular meaning. Into midrash-bama come elements of colour (Often seen in costume and scenery), elements of rhythm, texture and editing (direction) additions (writing), which have been highly thought out and prepared before. But the actual midrash-bama which takes place in real time, is often very different in each performance, (just as the study of the same text is often very different depending on your state of mind and with whom you are learning.)

See also Contemporary Midrash

== Educational-artistic programs ==
The company's work has led to the creation of a method for learning, perceiving and internalizing texts. TCJ creates and Produces an annual Midrash Bama festival whose aim is to present multidisciplinary theatre in an intimate setting in order to promote dialogue and intimacy.

Throughout the years a diversified community of artists and teachers has grown around the company. Through its work, this multi-disciplinary group tests the boundaries of theatre, art, religion, gender, social processes and the relationships between them. These collaborations have created of a variety of courses: Women's Empowerment and Leadership, Empowerment for Young Women and Girls, Projects to integrate Young Women in Distress within various courses, Teacher Training in Jewish Studies and an annual Festival for Young Women Artists.

== International Jewish Festival ==
TCJ has been annually hosting the International Jewish Festival at Bet Mazia Theater, TCJ's resident theater in Jerusalem. The festival lasts five days and presents various programs such as music and dance performances, international productions, premieres, one-time performances, video art projections, and stand-up comedies. The festival had received funding from the Jerusalem Municipality and Ministry of Culture. The company also organized a festival during the pandemic, with all the performances filmed and presented through Zoom. Additionally, the company launched a three-day festival Bazak, which is for shorter pieces that are not necessarily Jewish-themed.

== Productions ==
- Maase Bruria – The act of Bruria (1982)
- Chagiga Lamama (1983)
- Elef Ester Vehester (1984)
- Afilu Hazipporim – Even the Birds (1987)
- Kuzinot Yefefiyot (1988)
- Kneidal Bar (1989)
- Hedei Tefila – Echoes of Prayer (1990)
- Al Mita u Mitot- Babylonian Tales (1990)
- English version – Babylonian Tales (1991)
- Gisati Veani- My sister in law and I (1991)
- Ahava Bemivhan – Love tested (1991)
- Hahatzaga Haachrona (1993)
- Ester (1993)
- Sara – Take 1 (1993)
- Sara – Take 2 (1994)
- Sara take 2 – English version (1995)
- Siach hayasmin – The Jasmine Bush (1995)
- Shirei Nistarot Veniglot – Songs Inner and Revealed (1998)
- Sota (1999)
- Ayin Zoher – Songs to the Invisible God (1999)
- Ayin Zoher (2000)
- Noshek Bazman- Songs of Desire (2001)
- Siftotav Shoshanim (2002)
- La Vie en Rose (2002)
- Ezel Roza baCafe – Cafe Roza (2004)
- Afilu Haziporim – Even the Birds (2004)
- Shulem (2005)
- Zohar Shabbat (2006)
- At Kvar Meusheret – Are You Happy Yet? (2006)
- Nashim Veniflaot – Women and Wonders (2007)
- Gaaguim, Naanuim. Shaashuim – Yearning (2007)
- Rondo (2008)
- Kadayil Shabbaso (2008)
- Midrash Bama (2009)
- Ahava Atika (2010)
- Isha Chalma Ish- Woman dreams Man (2011)
- Dalia, Zelda and Rachel (2012)

=== Before the formation of Theatre Company Jerusalem ===
- Nashim Odot Nashim – Woman about Woman (1975)
- Anashim Racim – Soft People (1977)

== Awards and festivals ==
- United Nations Prize during the International Year of the Woman
- Meir Margalit Prize for Outstanding Theatrical Achievement
- The Edinburgh Festival Fringe – Fringe First
- The Acre Festival for Alternative Theatre – Israel
- The Edinburgh Festival – Scotland
- The Woman's Festival for Performing Arts – Jerusalem
- The Festival for Theatre from Ancient Myths – Hungary
- Performances and residency, Kulturhuset – Stockholm, Sweden
- The Israel Expo – New York
- The Israel Festival – Jerusalem
- The Festival of the Promised Land – Lodz, Poland
- Sacred Music Festivals – India, Thailand, and England
- Artistic residency and Performances – New Delhi, India
