= Lvov (surname) =

Lvov (feminine form: Lvova) is a surname of Russian origin. Notable people with the surname include:

- Lvov princely family
  - Alexei Lvov (1799–1870), Russian composer
  - Georgy Lvov (1861–1925), Russian politician and minister-chairman of the Russian Provisional Government (1917)
  - Lidia Lwow-Eberle (1920–2021), Polish WWII partisan of Armia Krajowa
- Lvov dvoryan families
- Valery Lvov (1953–2025), Soviet-Russian boxer
- Aaron Moses Lwow (fl. 18th century), Polish grammarian, scribe, and dayyan
- André Michel Lwoff (1902–1994), French microbiologist of Russian-Polish origin
- Maria Lvova-Belova (born 1984), Russian politician
- Maria Lvova-Sinetskaya (1795–1875), Russian stage actress

== See also ==
- Lwów (disambiguation)
- Lviv (disambiguation)
- Lvovsky (disambiguation)
