= Gabriella Lev =

Australian theatre director and performer

Gabriella Lev is a theatre director, writer and performer. She co-founded the Theatre Company Jerusalem and currently serves as its artistic director. She has won many awards, including the Kipod Hazahav award for life achievement in fringe theatre, the My Jerusalem Award for contribution to cultural life in Jerusalem 2010, and the WIZO award.

In 2016 Theatre Company Jerusalem spearheaded the first International Festival of Jewish Performance Arts. The festival has now become an annual event.

== Biography ==
Gabriella Lev graduated from University of New South Wales where she majored in theatre in 1969. There she played many varied roles, including Gertrude in Shakespeare's Hamlet and Joan in George Bernard Shaw's Saint Joan.

In 1971 Lev attended the London Film School, where she joined an alternative theatre company, The Low Moan Spectacular and helped create El Coca Cola Grande in which she also performed. Lev performed in various theatres in the U.K. including the Hampstead Theatre Club, Greenwich Theatre, the Close, the Citizens Theatre, Glasgow, the National Theatre of Wales and Bristol Old Vic as well as appearing in various theatres in Europe.

== Influences ==
Lev was influenced by the alternative theatre scene in London in the 1970s where she first came into contact with such troupes as the People Show and practitioners such as Charles Marowitz.

In 1973 Gabriella Lev made aliyah to Israel, which had a great effect on her work. She participated in a 10-day workshop given by Andre Gregory and Jaques Chwat at Mishkenot Sha'ananim. This exposure to work inspired by Jerzy Grotowski influenced her artistically. Later she collaborated with Serge Quaknine a student of Grotowskis. Also in this period she first came into contact with the voice work of the Roy Hart Theatre and co-operated with members of the theatre particularly Barry Coglhan for many years. In her first year in the country she worked in various schools and community centres teaching drama.

== Ensembles created ==
Lev established the Odot Company which produced two original Israeli theatre pieces, Nashim Odot Nashim and Anashim Rakim. She later helped establish The Jerusalem Drama Workshop and was its director for three years. This establishment grew into the Theatre Company Jerusalem which she co-founded and today is its artistic director. The original works of TCJ have won much acclaim and recognition. The company has been invited to perform at many theatre festivals around the world.

== Works ==
=== Initiated and co-created ===
- Maaseh Bruria - with Aliza Elion Israeli, Ruth Wieder Magan, Joyce Miller 1982
- Elef Ester VeEster - with Aliza Elion Israeli, Ruth Wieder Magan, Joyce Miller 1984
- Al Mita Vemitot - with Aliza Elion Israeli, Mario Kutler, Joyce Miller 1989
- Sara Take 2 - 1993
- Sota - 1997
- At Rosa's Café - 2004
- Ahava Atika - 2010
- Her Story - 2014
- Mochot - 2014

=== Written and performed ===
- Ester 1990
- Shulem with Serge Ouknine, Ayellet Stoller, Avishi Fish, Gershon Weisfierer 2005

=== Directed ===
- Even the Birds - by Aliza Elion Israeli 1987
- Echoes of Prayer - with Ruth Wieder-Magan 1992
- Are You Happy Already? - by Varda Ben Chur
- Rondo - by Aliza Elion Israeli
- Ancient Loves
- Sait of the Earth by Dan Kedem
- She רה texts by Agi Mishol and Dorit Weisman
- Ben and Sara by Ayellet Solomon
- Good Intentions by Rasel Dickstein
- Impressions of Zelda texts by Zelda Schneurson Mishkovsky
- Measure for Measure by Shakespeare
- When a Special Child is Born
- Three Queens and a Concubine texts from Samuel 1 and 2 Yona Wallach, Yoav Michaeli, Merav Meshulam
- The Spotted Tiger by Yaakov Shabtai 2018

== Reviews ==
Lev's performances combine story telling, lecturing, and interactive dialogue with the audience. They have also been received with critical acclaim: In 2000, the Baltimore Sun praised her work Esther, based on the biblical queen, as "an extremely well-crafted Sunday school lesson."
