= Lwów Voivodeship (1944–1945) =

Former voivodeship of Poland from 1944 to 1945

- Voivodeship of Poland
- 1944–1945
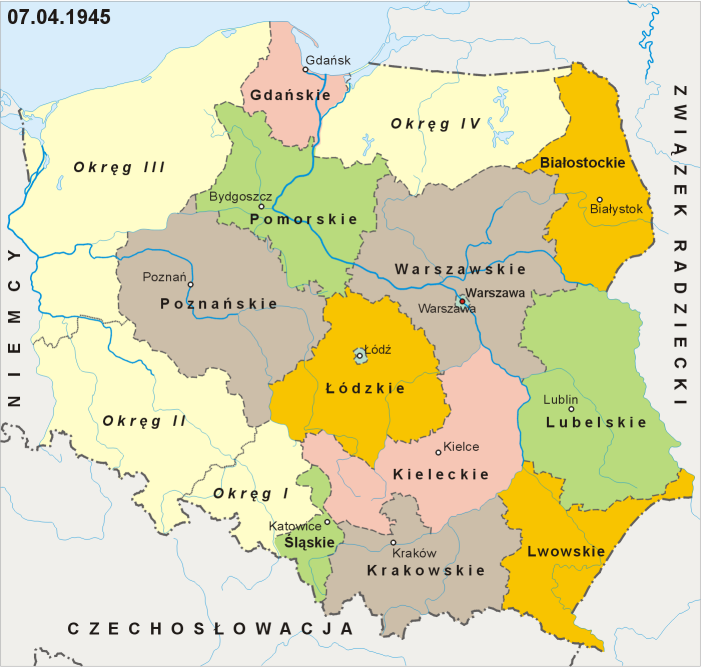
- The subdivisions of Poland in July 1945, including the Lwów Voivodeship.
- Capital: Rzeszów
- Government
  - Type: Voivodeship
- Voivode
  - 1944 (first): Wiktor Jedliński
  - 1945 (last): Jan Mirek
- History
  - Established: 22 August 1944
  - Disestablished: 18 August 1945
- Contained within
  - Country: Provisional Government of the Republic of Poland (1944–1945); Provisional Government of National Unity (1945)
Preceded by	Succeeded by
General Government	Rzeszów Voivodeship; Lublin Voivodeship

The Lwów Voivodeship (Note: Polish: Województwo lwowskie) was a short-lived voivodeship (province) of Poland, with capital in Rzeszów, that existed from 1944 to 1945. It was established on 22 August 1944, and until 28 June 1945, remained under the administration of the Provisional Government of the Republic of Poland, which then was replaced by the Provisional Government of National Unity. It existed until 18 August 1945, when it was incorporated into the then-established Rzeszów Voivodeship.

== History ==
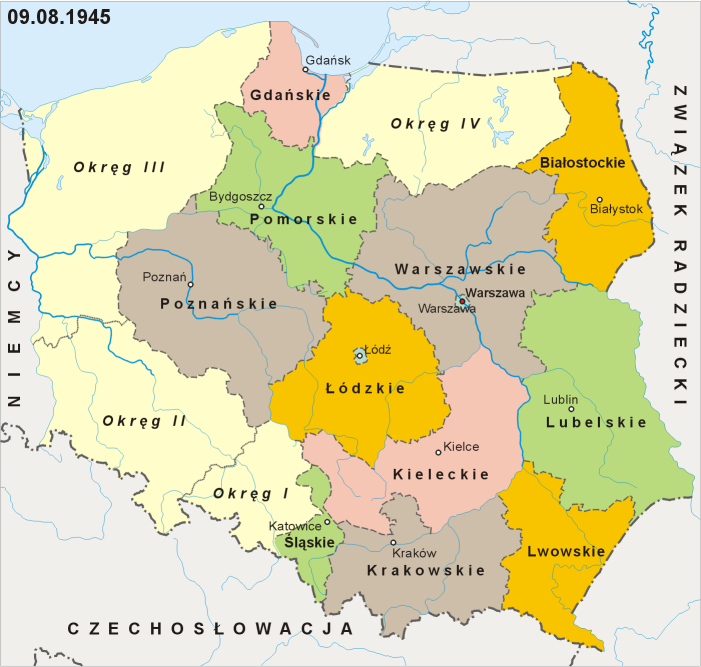
The subdivisions of Poland in August 1945, including the Lwów Voivodeship shortly before its disestablishment, following the transfer of several of the northern-east municipalities to the Lublin Voivodeship.

The Lwów Voivodeship was established on 22 August 1944, by the Provisional Government of the Republic of Poland, within the borders of the Lwów Voivodeship of the Second Polish Republic, that existed from 1919 to 1939, with the exceptions of the territories that by-then belonged to the Soviet Union. It replaced the subdivisions of the General Government. Its capital was located in the city of Rzeszów. Until 28 June 1945, it remained under the administration of the Provisional Government of the Republic of Poland, which then was replaced by the Provisional Government of National Unity.

At the time, the final border between Poland and the Soviet Union, was still being uncertain, which included the affiliation of the namesake of the voivodeship, the city of Lviv, known in Polish, as Lwów, which was located within the territory of the Ukrainian SSR, Soviet Union. As such, the Polish government refrained from officially referring to the region by the name of the city, instead usually referring to it as the voivodeship with the capital in Rzeszów.

On 7 July 1945, it was decided that the voivodeship would be disestablished and replaced by the Rzeszów Voivodeship, which happened on 18 August 1945.

Shortly before the disestablishment of the voivodeship, several gminas (municipalities) of the counties of Rawa and Sokal, were ceded to the Lublin Voivodeship. Those were the municipalities of Lubycza Królewska, Uhnów, and Tarnoszyn, of the Rawa County, and the municipalities of Krystynopol, Chorobrów, Waręż, and Bełz, of the Sokal County. It remains unknown when exactly all of them were transferred, however it is known that the municipality of Tarnoszyn was transferred on 9 August 1945.

The Polish–Soviet border agreement had been signed on 16 August 1945, finalizing the border, and confirming the alliance of the city of Lviv to the Soviet Union.

== Subdivisions ==
The voivodeship was divided into counties. Those were:

- Brzozów County (seat: Brzozów);
- Jarosław County (seat: Jarosław);
- Kolbuszowa County (seat: Kolbuszowa);
- Krosno County (seat: Krosno);
- Lubaczów County (seat: Lubaczów);
- Łańcut County (seat: Łańcut);
- Lesko County (seat: Lesko);
- Nisko County (seat: Nisko);
- Przemyśl County (seat: Przemyśl);
- Przeworsk County (seat: Przeworsk);
- Sanok County (seat: Sanok);
- Sokal County (seat: Sokal);
- Rawa County;
- Rzeszów County (seat: Rzeszów);
- Tarnobrzeg County (seat: Tarnobrzeg).

== Leaders ==
The leader of the voivodeship was the voivode. The people in that office were:

- 22 August 1944 – 22 September 1944: Wiktor Jedliński
- 22 September 1944 – 22 October 1944: Stanisław Janusz
- 22 October 1944 – 30 June 1945: Stanisław Tkaczow
- 1 July 1945 – 31 July 1945: Edward Kluk
- 1 August 1945 – 18 August 1945 Jan Mirek
