= Martyringa hoenei =

Scientific classification
- Kingdom: Animalia
- Phylum: Arthropoda
- Clade: Pancrustacea
- Class: Insecta
- Order: Lepidoptera
- Family: Lecithoceridae
- Genus: Martyringa
- Species: M. hoenei

Binomial name
- Martyringa hoenei Lvovsky, 2010

Species of moth

Martyringa hoenei is a moth in the family Lecithoceridae. It was described by Alexandr L. Lvovsky in 2010. It is found in Yunnan, China.

The wingspan is 19–24 mm.
