= Lev! =

Swedish artwork

Coordinates: 63.8297°N 20.2667°E

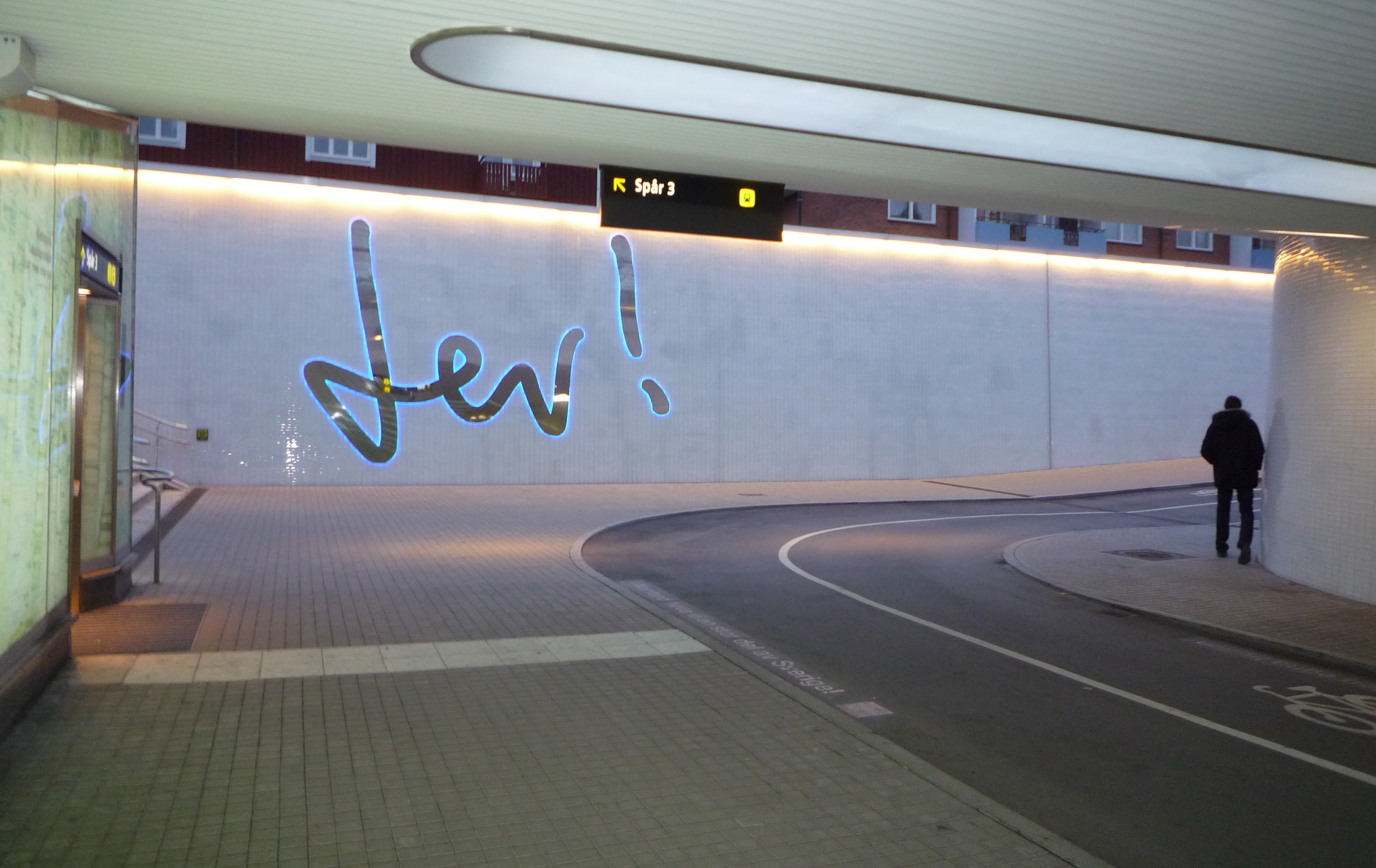
- The word "Lev!", northern wall in the evening
- Year: 17 November 2012; 13 years ago
- Medium: Glass
- Dimensions: 170 meters (560 feet)
- Location: Umeå

Lev! (Swedish for Live!) is a 170-meter (560 ft) long glass artwork in the pedestrian and bicycle tunnel between the Railway Station Square in central Umeå and Haga District in Sweden. It was inaugurated on 17 November 2012 in conjunction with the festival Autumn Light and the reopening of Umeå Central Station.

The work is dedicated to the memory of writer Sara Lidman. The display has 16 audio channels, of which four are interactive. It is among the largest glass artworks in Europe.

== More images ==
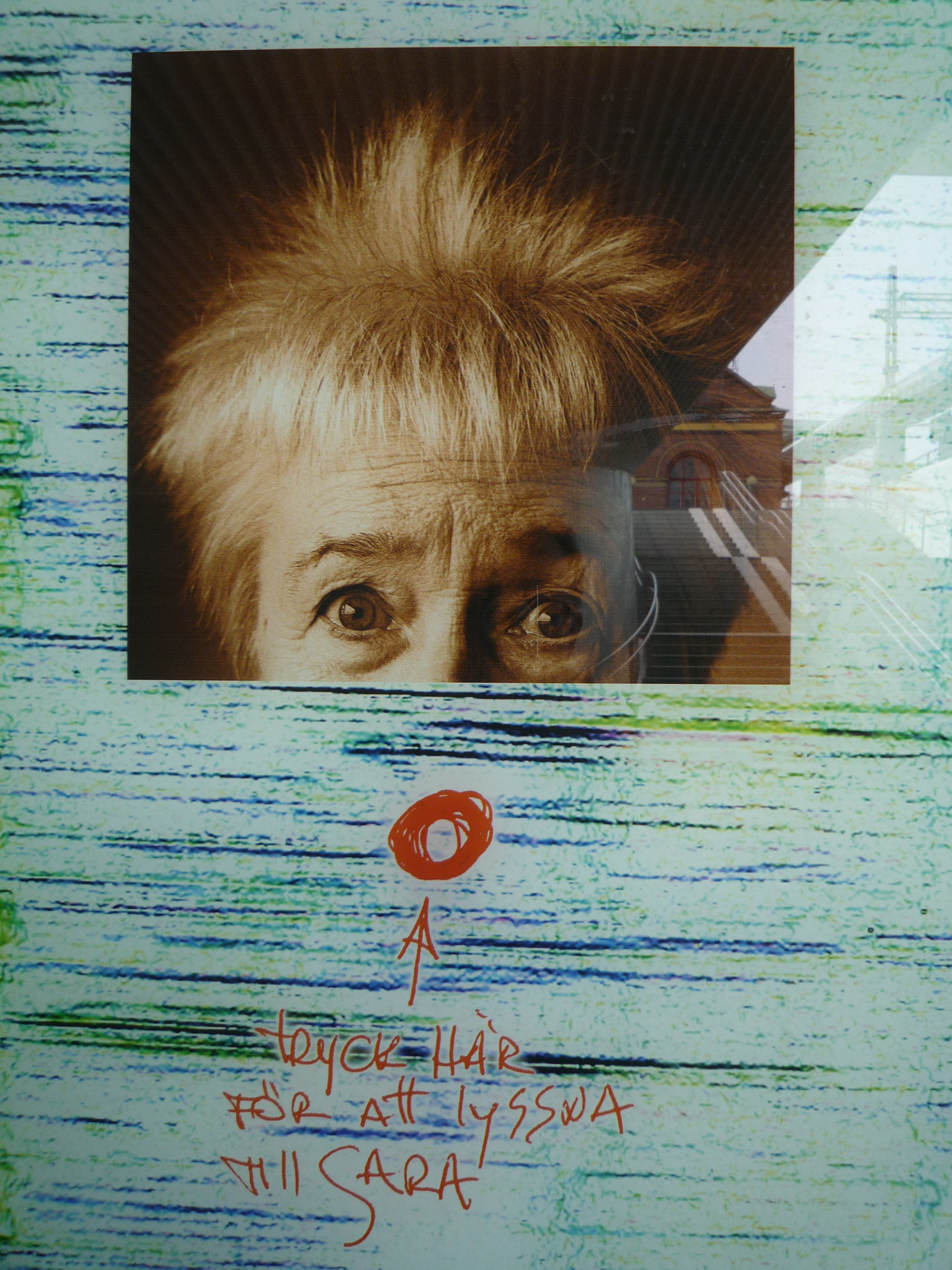
Photographed at the tunnel's western wall

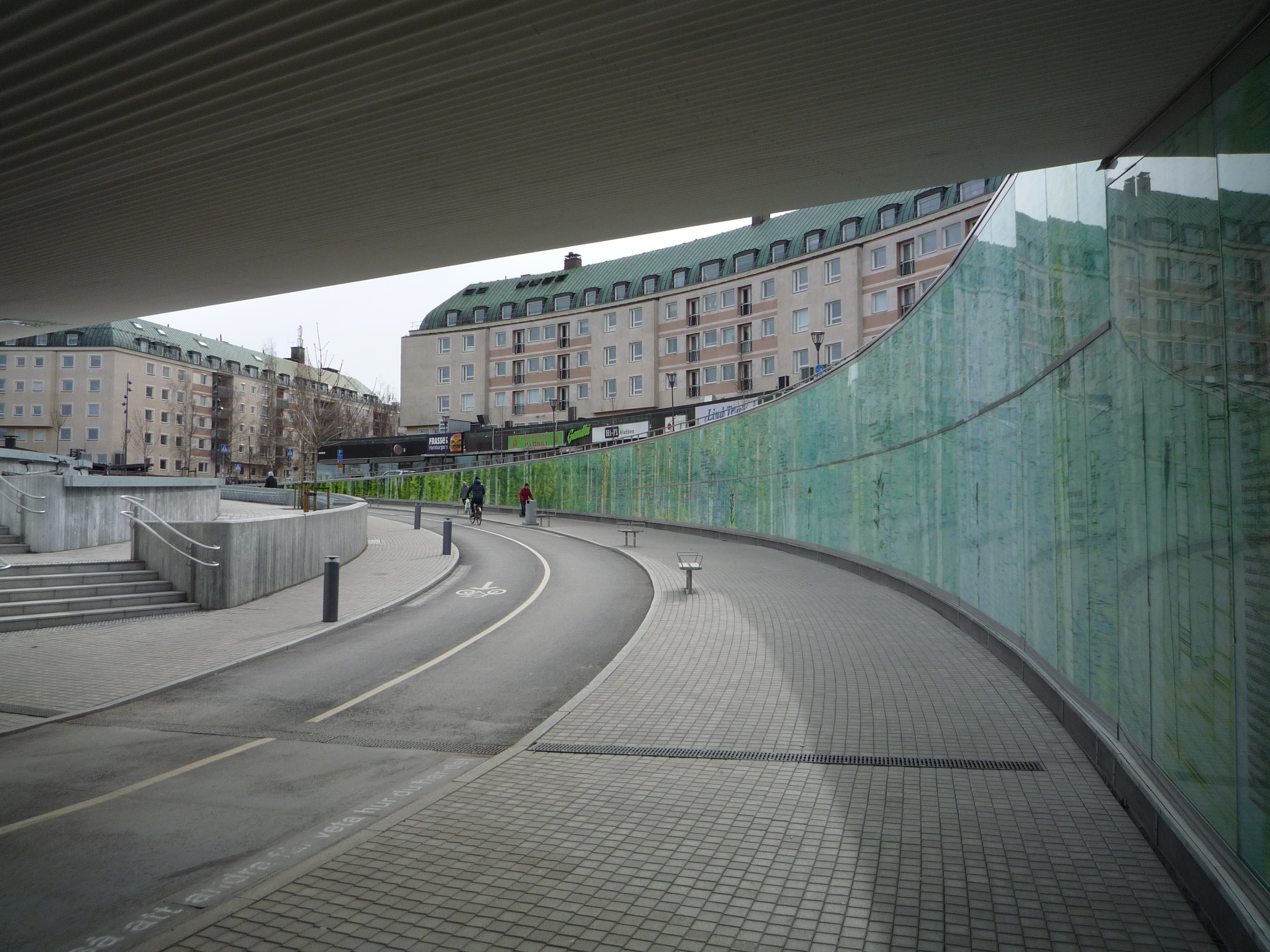
Glass artwork covers the walls of the tunnel
