= Lev (crater) =

Crater on the Moon

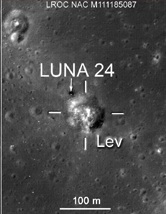
- LRO image with the landing site of Luna 24.
- Coordinates: 12.69°N 62.2°E
- Diameter: 60 m
- Eponym: Russian masculine name

Lev is a tiny lunar crater located in the southeast part of the Mare Crisium in the east of the lunar near side. The crater is located between the larger crater Fahrenheit to the northwest and the wrinkle ridge Dorsa Harker to the southeast. The name Lev does not refer to a specific person; it is a Russian male given name. Northwest of the crater was the Luna 24 landing site.

== Location ==
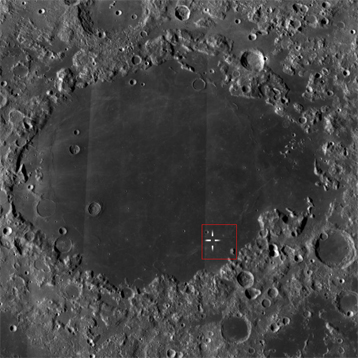
Location of Lev Crater in Mare Crisium
