= Lvovsky =

Lvovsky (masculine), Lvovskaya (feminine), or Lvovskoye (neuter) may refer to:

- Lvovsky, Moscow Oblast, formerly an urban-type settlement, now a microdistrict of Podolsk, Moscow Oblast, Russia
- Lvovskoye, Tver Oblast, a village in Tver Oblast, Russia
- an island in Lake Nero, Yaroslavl Oblast, Russia

== People with the surname ==
- Celia Lovsky (Caecilie Lvovsky; 1897–1979), Austrian-American actress
- Noémie Lvovsky (born 1964), French film director, screenwriter, and actress
- Alexandr L. Lvovsky (Russian: Львовский, Александр Леонидович), discoverer of many plant species including Martyringa hoenei, and taxonomic authority
