= Lviv pogrom =

Lviv or Lwów pogrom may refer to:

- Lwów pogrom (1914)
- Lwów pogrom (1918)
- Lviv pogroms (1941)
