= Aaron Moses Lwow =

Grammarian, scribe, and dayyan of Lemberg

Aaron Moses ben Ẓebi Hirsch Lwow (Hebrew: אהרן משה בן צבי הירש לבוב, romanized: Aharon Mosheh ben Tsevi Hirsh Lvov; fl. 18th century) was a grammarian, scribe, and dayyan of Lemberg.

He wrote Shirah Ḥadashah (Zolkiev, 1764), a Hebrew grammar in verse, divided into six poems with explanations in prose, composed after the model of Elijah Levita's Pereḳ Shirah; Ohel Mosheh (Zolkiev, 1765), a complete Hebrew grammar in four parts, following Ḳimḥi's Sefer ha-Zikkaron and criticizing Zalman Hanau; also Halakah le-Mosheh, novellæ on the Talmud and decisions; and Ohel Mo'ed, a treatise on the Hebrew language, neither of which were published.

== Publications ==
- Shirah Ḥadashah. Zolkiev. 1764.
- Ohel Mosheh. Zolkiev. 1765.
- Halakah le-Mosheh.
- Ohel Mo'ed.
