= Battle of Lwów =

Battle of Lwów, Battle of Lviv or Battle of Lemberg may refer to:

- Battle of Lwów (1675), a battle in which Ottoman armies were defeated by Poles under John III Sobieski
- Battle of Lwów (1695), a battle in which Ottoman armies were defeated by Hussars under hetman Stanisław Jan Jabłonowski
- Storming of Lemberg (1704), an assault by which Lwów was captured and looted by Sweden during the Great Northern War
- Battle of Lemberg (1914), or Battle of Galicia, a battle in which Lemberg was captured by Russia at the outbreak of World War I
- Battle of Lemberg (1915), a battle in which Lviv was recaptured by Austria-Hungary; included the 4th Division
- Battle of Lemberg (1918), urban fighting between local Polish inhabitants and the forces of West Ukrainian People's Republic
- Battle of Lwów (1920), fights of several weeks' duration at the outskirts of the city between the Polish Army and the Red Army during the Polish–Bolshevik War
- Battle of Lwów (1939), a siege of Lwów by Germany during the Invasion of Poland of 1939 at the outbreak of World War II; capitulated to the Soviet Union
- Battle of Lwów (1941), an engagement which saw the city fall to the Germans in 1941
- Lvov–Sandomierz offensive, a 1944 offensive by the Soviet Union against Germany
- Lwów Uprising, a 1944 battle in which the city was captured by the Polish Home Army and the Soviet Union during World War II
