= List of Midland Football League (1889) clubs =

The following is a list of clubs who played in the original Midland Football League from its formation in 1889 until it closed in 1982.

== Clubs ==
- Alfreton Town
- Appleby Frodingham
- Arnold (first team and reserves)
- Arnold Kingswell
- Ashby Institute
- Ashington
- Ashton United
- Attenborough
- Barnsley (first team and reserves)
- Barton Town
- Belper Town (first team and reserves)
- Blyth Spartans
- Borrowash Victoria
- Boston
- Boston Town
- Boston United
- Bourne Town
- Bradford City (reserves only)
- Bradford Park Avenue (reserves only)
- Bridlington Trinity
- Brigg Town
- Brimington
- Burslem Port Vale
- Burton Town
- Burton United (reserves only)
- Carrvale United
- Castleford Town
- Chesterfield (first team and reserves)
- Clay Cross Works
- Clifton All Whites (first team and reserves)
- Coalville Town
- Consett
- Corby Town
- Creswell Colliery
- Denaby United
- Derby County (reserves only)
- Derby Junction
- Derby Midland
- Dinnington Colliery
- Doncaster Rovers (first team and reserves)
- Dresden United
- Eastwood Town (first team and reserves)
- Folk House Old Boys
- Frickley Colliery
- Gainsborough Trinity (first team and reserves)
- Gateshead
- Glossop North End
- Goole Town
- Graham Street Prims
- Grantham
- Greenhalgh's
- Grimsby Town (first team and reserves)
- Guisborough Town
- Halifax Town (first team and reserves)
- Harrogate
- Heanor Town
- Heckmondwike
- Hednesford
- Hinckley Town
- Holbeach United
- Horden Colliery Welfare
- Huddersfield Town (first team and reserves)
- Hull City (reserves only)
- Ilkeston Town (first team and reserves)
- Kettering
- Kidderminster
- Kimberley Town (first team and reserves)
- King's Lynn
- Leeds City (reserves only)
- Leeds United (first team and reserves)
- Leek
- Leicester Fosse (first team and reserves)
- Linby Colliery Welfare
- Lincoln City (first team and reserves)
- Lockheed Leamington
- Long Eaton
- Long Eaton Grange
- Long Eaton Rangers
- Long Eaton United (first team and reserves)
- Loughborough Corinthians
- Loughborough
- Loughborough United
- Louth United
- Mansfield
- Mansfield Town
- Matlock
- Matlock Town
- Mexborough
- Mexborough Athletic
- Mexborough Town
- Newark
- North Shields
- Northampton Town
- Norwich City (reserves only)
- Nottingham Forest (reserves only)
- Notts County
- Notts Rangers
- Oakham United
- Ollerton Colliery
- Peterborough United
- Ransome & Marles
- Retford Rail
- Retford Town (first team and reserves)
- Ripley Town
- Rolls Royce Hucknall
- Rotherham County (first team and reserves)
- Rotherham Town [I]
- Rotherham Town [II]
- Rotherham United (reserves only)
- Rushden Town
- Scarborough
- Scunthorpe United (first team and reserves)
- Sheffield
- Sheffield United
- Shepshed Charterhouse
- Shirebrook
- Shrewsbury Town
- Silverwood Colliery
- Skegness Town
- South Shields
- Spalding United
- Spennymoor United
- Stamford
- Staveley
- Staveley Welfare
- Staveley Works
- Stockport County
- Stockton
- Stoke Swifts
- Sutton Town (first team and reserves)
- Sutton Trinity
- The Wednesday (reserves only)
- TI Chesterfield
- Wakefield City
- Walsall
- Warley
- Warwick County
- Wath Athletic
- Wednesbury Old Athletic
- Wellingborough
- Whitwick White Cross
- Wisbech Town
- Wombwell
- Worksop Town
- York City [I]
- York City [II]
