= 1980–81 Midland Football League =

The 1980–81 Midland Football League was the 81st in the history of the Midland Football League, a football competition in England.

== Premier Division ==
Midland Football League Premier Division
- Season: 1980–81
- Champions: Boston
- Relegated: Kimberley Town
- Matches: 306
- Goals: 922 (3.01 per match)

The Premier Division featured 17 clubs which competed in the previous season, along with one new club:

- Guisborough Town, joined from the Northern Football Alliance

=== League table ===
| Pos | Team | Pld | W | D | L | GF | GA | GD | Pts | Qualification or relegation |
|---|---|---|---|---|---|---|---|---|---|---|
| 1 | Boston | 34 | 23 | 9 | 2 | 70 | 18 | +52 | 55 | |
| 2 | Alfreton Town | 34 | 16 | 10 | 8 | 73 | 40 | +33 | 42 | |
| 3 | Eastwood Town | 34 | 16 | 9 | 9 | 63 | 41 | +22 | 41 | |
| 4 | Bridlington Trinity | 34 | 15 | 10 | 9 | 63 | 40 | +23 | 40 | |
| 5 | Guisborough Town | 34 | 16 | 7 | 11 | 60 | 48 | +12 | 39 | |
| 6 | Belper Town | 34 | 15 | 8 | 11 | 44 | 43 | +1 | 38 | |
| 7 | Arnold | 34 | 14 | 8 | 12 | 55 | 47 | +8 | 36 | |
| 8 | Heanor Town | 34 | 13 | 10 | 11 | 57 | 52 | +5 | 36 | |
| 9 | Skegness Town | 34 | 12 | 11 | 11 | 49 | 52 | −3 | 35 | |
| 10 | Long Eaton United | 34 | 13 | 8 | 13 | 54 | 51 | +3 | 34 | |
| 11 | Appleby Frodingham | 34 | 12 | 10 | 12 | 56 | 56 | 0 | 34 | |
| 12 | Sutton Town | 34 | 12 | 10 | 12 | 48 | 51 | −3 | 34 | |
| 13 | Mexborough Town Athletic | 34 | 12 | 5 | 17 | 42 | 67 | −25 | 29 | |
| 14 | Spalding United | 34 | 10 | 7 | 17 | 28 | 47 | −19 | 27 | |
| 15 | Ashby Institute | 34 | 12 | 3 | 19 | 40 | 60 | −20 | 27 | |
| 16 | Ilkeston Town | 34 | 7 | 9 | 18 | 44 | 65 | −21 | 23 | |
| 17 | Brigg Town | 34 | 6 | 10 | 18 | 42 | 63 | −21 | 22 | |
| 18 | Kimberley Town | 34 | 6 | 8 | 20 | 34 | 81 | −47 | 20 | Relegated to Division One |

Source: nonleaguematters
Rules for classification: 1) points; 2) goal difference; 3) number of goals scored.
The points system until the 1990–91 season: 2 points for a win, 1 point for a draw and 0 points for losing.

== Division One ==
Midland Football League Division One
- Season: 1980–81
- Champions: Borrowash Victoria
- Matches: 240
- Goals: 744 (3.1 per match)

Division One featured 15 clubs which competed in the previous season, along with one new club:

- Folk House Old Boys

=== League table ===
| Pos | Team | Pld | W | D | L | GF | GA | GD | Pts | Qualification or relegation |
|---|---|---|---|---|---|---|---|---|---|---|
| 1 | Borrowash Victoria | 30 | 22 | 6 | 2 | 79 | 32 | +47 | 50 | |
| 2 | Staveley Works | 30 | 20 | 6 | 4 | 67 | 24 | +43 | 46 | |
| 3 | Arnold Kingswell | 30 | 17 | 8 | 5 | 71 | 37 | +34 | 42 | |
| 4 | Sutton Trinity | 30 | 17 | 5 | 8 | 52 | 27 | +25 | 39 | |
| 5 | Folk House Old Boys | 30 | 15 | 6 | 9 | 42 | 28 | +14 | 36 | |
| 6 | Long Eaton Grange | 30 | 13 | 7 | 10 | 42 | 40 | +2 | 33 | |
| 7 | Oakham United | 30 | 11 | 10 | 9 | 43 | 45 | −2 | 32 | |
| 8 | Linby Colliery | 30 | 10 | 7 | 13 | 41 | 44 | −3 | 27 | Resigned from the league |
| 9 | Creswell Colliery | 30 | 8 | 9 | 13 | 37 | 53 | −16 | 25 | |
| 10 | Long Eaton United reserves | 30 | 10 | 4 | 16 | 41 | 57 | −16 | 24 | |
| 11 | Retford Rail | 30 | 9 | 5 | 16 | 40 | 50 | −10 | 23 | |
| 12 | Eastwood Town reserves | 30 | 6 | 11 | 13 | 45 | 61 | −16 | 23 | |
| 13 | Carrvale United | 30 | 9 | 5 | 16 | 38 | 56 | −18 | 23 | Resigned from the league |
| 14 | Arnold reserves | 30 | 7 | 7 | 16 | 42 | 58 | −16 | 21 | |
| 15 | Rolls Royce (Hucknall) | 30 | 8 | 4 | 18 | 39 | 60 | −21 | 20 | |
| 16 | Attenborough | 30 | 6 | 4 | 20 | 25 | 72 | −47 | 16 | |

Source: nonleaguematters
Rules for classification: 1) points; 2) goal difference; 3) number of goals scored.
The points system until the 1990–91 season: 2 points for a win, 1 point for a draw and 0 points for losing.
