= 1976–77 Midland Football League =

The 1976–77 Midland Football League was the 77th in the history of the Midland Football League, a football competition in England.

== Premier Division ==
Midland Football League Premier Division
- Season: 1976–77
- Champions: Alfreton Town
- Matches: 306
- Goals: 834 (2.73 per match)

The Premier Division featured 17 clubs which competed in the previous season, along with one new club:

- Brigg Town, joined from the Lincolnshire Football League

=== League table ===
Pos	Team	Pld	W	D	L	GF	GA	GD	Pts
1	Alfreton Town	34	24	5	5	79	33	+46	53
2	Long Eaton United	34	20	6	8	66	36	+30	46
3	Brigg Town	34	16	13	5	54	32	+22	45
4	Arnold	34	18	6	10	63	38	+25	42
5	Eastwood Town	34	14	11	9	57	41	+16	39
6	Mexborough Town Athletic	34	14	11	9	50	37	+13	39
7	Boston	34	14	10	10	42	26	+16	38
8	Louth United	34	14	8	12	61	55	+6	36
9	Sutton Town	34	12	11	11	39	45	−6	35
10	Bridlington Trinity	34	12	8	14	43	51	−8	32
11	Kimberley Town	34	12	6	16	40	54	−14	30
12	Heanor Town	34	10	9	15	38	59	−21	29
13	Skegness Town	34	10	7	17	29	42	−13	27
14	Belper Town	34	8	10	16	31	48	−17	26
15	Ilkeston Town	34	9	8	17	41	66	−25	26
16	Clifton All Whites	34	6	13	15	28	51	−23	25
17	Retford Town	34	7	8	19	39	59	−20	22
18	Ashby Institute	34	6	10	18	34	61	−27	22

Source: nonleaguematters
Rules for classification: 1) points; 2) goal difference; 3) number of goals scored.
The points system until the 1990–91 season: 2 points for a win, 1 point for a draw and 0 points for losing.

== Division One ==
Midland Football League Division One
- Season: 1976–77
- Champions: Long Eaton Grange
- Matches: 272
- Goals: 881 (3.24 per match)

Division One featured 13 clubs which competed in the previous season, along with four new clubs:

- Attenborough, joined from the Central Alliance
- Carrvale United
- Dinnington Colliery
- Ilkeston Town reserves

=== League table ===
Pos	Team	Pld	W	D	L	GF	GA	GD	Pts	Qualification or relegation
1	Long Eaton Grange	32	22	6	4	77	18	+59	50	
2	Staveley Works	32	21	7	4	64	31	+33	49	
3	Arnold Kingswell	32	19	9	4	69	24	+45	47	
4	Linby Colliery	32	20	6	6	72	35	+37	46	
5	Clay Cross Works	32	16	8	8	66	48	+18	40	
6	Carrvale United	32	16	7	9	60	49	+11	39	
7	Brimington	32	13	11	8	44	31	+13	37	Resigned from the league
8	Attenborough	32	12	9	11	59	54	+5	33	
9	Clifton All Whites reserves	32	13	6	13	61	67	−6	32	
10	Dinnington Colliery	32	10	8	14	45	43	+2	28	
11	Oakham United	32	11	5	16	64	66	−2	27	
12	Arnold reserves	32	9	7	16	42	66	−24	25	
13	Eastwood Town reserves	32	6	11	15	35	67	−32	23	
14	Long Eaton United reserves	32	8	5	19	39	66	−27	21	
15	Ilkeston Town reserves	32	7	4	21	34	68	−34	18	
16	Sutton Town reserves	32	6	3	23	27	86	−59	15	Resigned from the league
17	Belper Town reserves	32	4	6	22	23	62	−39	14	

Source: nonleaguematters
Rules for classification: 1) points; 2) goal difference; 3) number of goals scored.
The points system until the 1990–91 season: 2 points for a win, 1 point for a draw and 0 points for losing.
