= 1977–78 Midland Football League =

The 1977–78 Midland Football League was the 78th in the history of the Midland Football League, a football competition in England.

== Premier Division ==
Midland Football League Premier Division
- Season: 1977–78
- Champions: Brigg Town
- Matches: 272
- Goals: 829 (3.05 per match)

The Premier Division featured 18 clubs which competed in the previous season, no new clubs joined the division this season.

=== League table ===
Pos	Team	Pld	W	D	L	GF	GA	GD	Pts	Qualification or relegation
1	Brigg Town	32	26	5	1	70	23	+47	57	
2	Eastwood Town	32	20	5	7	66	29	+37	45	
3	Louth United	32	18	8	6	77	54	+23	44	
4	Alfreton Town	32	20	2	10	52	37	+15	42	
5	Mexborough Town Athletic	32	14	9	9	55	41	+14	37	
6	Boston	32	15	5	12	50	37	+13	35	
7	Skegness Town	32	12	9	11	52	48	+4	33	
8	Long Eaton United	32	12	8	12	45	34	+11	32	
9	Belper Town	32	9	13	10	39	42	−3	31	
10	Arnold	32	11	8	13	42	51	−9	30	
11	Sutton Town	32	10	9	13	43	50	−7	29	
12	Heanor Town	32	8	11	13	40	50	−10	27	
13	Bridlington Trinity	32	7	10	15	30	55	−25	24	
14	Retford Town	32	8	6	18	49	74	−25	22	
15	Ashby Institute	32	5	10	17	40	64	−24	20	
16	Ilkeston Town	32	5	9	18	46	74	−28	19	
17	Kimberley Town	32	5	7	20	33	66	−33	17	
18	Clifton All Whites	0	0	0	0	0	0	0	0	Resigned from the league, record expunged

Source: nonleaguematters
Rules for classification: 1) points; 2) goal difference; 3) number of goals scored.
The points system until the 1990–91 season: 2 points for a win, 1 point for a draw and 0 points for losing.

== Division One ==
Midland Football League Division One
- Season: 1977–78
- Champions: Staveley Works
- Matches: 272
- Goals: 906 (3.33 per match)

Division One featured 15 clubs which competed in the previous season, along with three new clubs:

- Kimberley Town reserves
- Ripley Town, joined from the East Midlands Regional League
- TI Chesterfield, joined from the East Midlands Regional League

=== League table ===
Pos	Team	Pld	W	D	L	GF	GA	GD	Pts	Qualification or relegation
1	Staveley Works	32	21	5	6	87	26	+61	47	
2	Linby Colliery	32	21	4	7	78	29	+49	46	
3	Long Eaton Grange	32	19	8	5	65	23	+42	46	
4	Carrvale United	32	17	8	7	63	34	+29	42	
5	Ripley Town	32	17	7	8	56	38	+18	41	
6	TI Chesterfield	32	17	7	8	57	43	+14	41	
7	Oakham United	32	17	3	12	50	43	+7	37	
8	Clay Cross Works	32	15	5	12	52	47	+5	35	
9	Arnold reserves	32	14	6	12	71	58	+13	34	
10	Arnold Kingswell	32	12	8	12	47	42	+5	32	
11	Long Eaton United reserves	32	14	4	14	42	40	+2	32	
12	Attenborough	32	12	4	16	55	54	+1	28	
13	Eastwood Town reserves	32	7	5	20	52	81	−29	19	
14	Dinnington Colliery	32	7	5	20	34	65	−31	19	Resigned from the league
15	Ilkeston Town reserves	32	7	4	21	31	71	−40	18	Resigned from the league
16	Belper Town reserves	32	5	5	22	38	90	−52	15	Resigned from the league
17	Kimberley Town reserves	32	4	4	24	28	122	−94	12	
18	Clifton All Whites reserves	0	0	0	0	0	0	0	0	Resigned from the league, record expunged

Source: nonleaguematters
Rules for classification: 1) points; 2) goal difference; 3) number of goals scored.
The points system until the 1990–91 season: 2 points for a win, 1 point for a draw and 0 points for losing.
