= 1979–80 Midland Football League =

The 1979–80 Midland Football League was the 80th in the history of the Midland Football League, a football competition in England.

== Premier Division ==
Midland Football League Premier Division
- Season: 1979–80
- Champions: Belper Town
- Relegated: Retford Town
- Matches: 306
- Goals: 822 (2.69 per match)

The Premier Division featured 18 clubs which competed in the previous season, no new clubs joined the division this season.

=== League table ===
Pos	Team	Pld	W	D	L	GF	GA	GD	Pts	Qualification or relegation
1	Belper Town	34	18	11	5	50	25	+25	47	
2	Bridlington Trinity	34	19	9	6	56	34	+22	47	
3	Boston	34	18	8	8	60	28	+32	44	
4	Long Eaton United	34	17	9	8	50	32	+18	43	
5	Mexborough Town Athletic	34	13	13	8	46	38	+8	39	
6	Eastwood Town	34	16	6	12	57	43	+14	38	
7	Arnold	34	13	11	10	54	42	+12	37	
8	Heanor Town	34	14	9	11	53	49	+4	37	
9	Brigg Town	34	13	10	11	45	45	0	36	
10	Alfreton Town	34	11	13	10	45	46	−1	35	
11	Skegness Town	34	11	11	12	46	45	+1	33	
12	Ashby Institute	34	12	7	15	43	52	−9	31	
13	Ilkeston Town	34	9	12	13	36	37	−1	30	
14	Kimberley Town	34	11	8	15	38	53	−15	30	
15	Appleby Frodingham	34	9	10	15	55	61	−6	28	
16	Spalding United	34	5	13	16	32	51	−19	23	
17	Sutton Town	34	6	10	18	33	58	−25	22	
18	Retford Town	34	3	6	25	23	83	−60	12	Not re-elected, relegated to the Retford & District League

Source: nonleaguematters
Rules for classification: 1) points; 2) goal difference; 3) number of goals scored.
The points system until the 1990–91 season: 2 points for a win, 1 point for a draw and 0 points for losing.

== Division One ==
Midland Football League Division One
- Season: 1979–80
- Champions: Arnold Kingswell
- Matches: 240
- Goals: 744 (3.1 per match)

Division One featured 12 clubs which competed in the previous season, along with four new clubs:

- Borrowash Victoria, joined from the East Midlands Regional League
- Retford Rail
- Rolls Royce (Hucknall)
- Sutton Trinity

=== League table ===
Pos	Team	Pld	W	D	L	GF	GA	GD	Pts	Qualification or relegation
1	Arnold Kingswell	30	17	11	2	76	37	+39	45	
2	Oakham United	30	19	5	6	63	34	+29	43	
3	Staveley Works	30	15	9	6	51	30	+21	39	
4	Borrowash Victoria	30	14	10	6	53	26	+27	38	
5	Long Eaton Grange	30	13	11	6	55	31	+24	37	
6	Linby Colliery	30	14	8	8	59	51	+8	36	
7	Creswell Colliery	30	13	8	9	51	43	+8	34	
8	Sutton Trinity	30	14	5	11	60	51	+9	33	
9	Eastwood Town reserves	30	11	6	13	49	49	0	28	
10	Arnold reserves	30	10	8	12	34	39	−5	28	
11	Grantham reserves	30	11	4	15	31	39	−8	26	Resigned from the league
12	Carrvale United	30	7	8	15	39	60	−21	22	
13	Attenborough	30	9	2	19	39	60	−21	20	
14	Long Eaton United reserves	30	6	7	17	48	95	−47	19	
15	Retford Rail	30	6	5	19	27	65	−38	17	
16	Rolls Royce (Hucknall)	30	5	5	20	52	77	−25	15	

Source: nonleaguematters
Rules for classification: 1) points; 2) goal difference; 3) number of goals scored.
The points system until the 1990–91 season: 2 points for a win, 1 point for a draw and 0 points for losing.
