= 1978–79 Midland Football League =

The 1978–79 Midland Football League was the 79th in the history of the Midland Football League, a football competition in England.

== Premier Division ==
Midland Football League Premier Division
- Season: 1978–79
- Champions: Boston
- Matches: 342
- Goals: 981 (2.87 per match)

The Premier Division featured 17 clubs which competed in the previous season, along with two new clubs:

- Appleby Frodingham, joined from the Lincolnshire League
- Spalding United, transferred from the United Counties League

=== League table ===
Pos	Team	Pld	W	D	L	GF	GA	GD	Pts	Qualification or relegation
1	Boston	36	24	6	6	70	27	+43	54	
2	Skegness Town	36	23	8	5	65	31	+34	54	
3	Mexborough Town Athletic	36	21	8	7	57	35	+22	50	
4	Eastwood Town	36	19	10	7	56	35	+21	48	
5	Bridlington Trinity	36	16	11	9	77	43	+34	43	
6	Arnold	36	14	14	8	56	50	+6	42	
7	Sutton Town	36	16	7	13	53	50	+3	39	
8	Long Eaton United	36	16	6	14	51	40	+11	38	
9	Brigg Town	36	12	9	15	52	54	−2	33	
10	Ashby Institute	36	13	7	16	36	48	−12	33	
11	Retford Town	36	12	8	16	49	49	0	32	
12	Appleby Frodingham	36	13	6	17	55	63	−8	32	
13	Ilkeston Town	36	11	9	16	52	61	−9	31	
14	Kimberley Town	36	7	16	13	46	54	−8	30	
15	Louth United	36	10	7	19	43	72	−29	27	Resigned to the Lincolnshire League
16	Spalding United	36	7	12	17	44	68	−24	26	
17	Alfreton Town	36	6	13	17	39	61	−22	25	
18	Heanor Town	36	7	10	19	37	64	−27	24	
19	Belper Town	36	6	11	19	43	76	−33	23	

Source: nonleaguematters
Rules for classification: 1) points; 2) goal difference; 3) number of goals scored.
The points system until the 1990–91 season: 2 points for a win, 1 point for a draw and 0 points for losing.

== Division One ==
Midland Football League Division One
- Season: 1978–79
- Champions: Long Eaton Grange
- Matches: 240
- Goals: 703 (2.93 per match)

Division One featured 14 clubs which competed in the previous season, along with two new clubs:

- Creswell Colliery, joined from the Sutton & Skegby League
- Grantham reserves

=== League table ===
Pos	Team	Pld	W	D	L	GF	GA	GD	Pts	Qualification or relegation
1	Long Eaton Grange	30	22	4	4	51	23	+28	48	
2	Arnold Kingswell	30	21	4	5	79	30	+49	46	
3	Oakham United	30	17	7	6	70	36	+34	41	
4	Creswell Colliery	30	14	10	6	53	37	+16	38	
5	Linby Colliery	30	14	7	9	58	36	+22	35	
6	Staveley Works	30	13	9	8	42	33	+9	35	
7	Grantham reserves	30	9	12	9	40	37	+3	30	
8	Long Eaton United reserves	30	13	2	15	43	50	−7	28	
9	Eastwood Town reserves	30	9	8	13	45	52	−7	26	
10	Attenborough	30	11	4	15	45	60	−15	26	
11	TI Chesterfield	30	8	9	13	36	39	−3	25	Resigned from the league
12	Arnold reserves	30	8	9	13	32	49	−17	25	
13	Carrvale United	30	6	8	16	27	54	−27	20	
14	Clay Cross Works	30	8	5	17	27	54	−27	21	Resigned from the league
15	Kimberley Town reserves	30	5	9	16	34	53	−19	19	Resigned from the league
16	Ripley Town	30	5	7	18	21	60	−39	17	Resigned from the league

Source: nonleaguematters
Rules for classification: 1) points; 2) goal difference; 3) number of goals scored.
The points system until the 1990–91 season: 2 points for a win, 1 point for a draw and 0 points for losing.
