= 1975–76 Midland Football League =

The 1975–76 Midland Football League was the 76th in the history of the Midland Football League, a football competition in England.

Also this season the league introduced Division One.

== Premier Division ==
Midland Football League Premier Division
- Season: 1975–76
- Champions: Eastwood Town
- Promoted: Frickley Colliery
- Matches: 306
- Goals: 905 (2.96 per match)

The Premier Division featured 18 clubs which competed in the previous season, no new clubs joined the division this season.

=== League table ===
Pos	Team	Pld	W	D	L	GF	GA	GD	Pts	Qualification or relegation
1	Eastwood Town	34	23	6	5	70	36	+34	52	
2	Arnold	34	20	9	5	74	44	+30	49	
3	Long Eaton United	34	17	12	5	47	31	+16	46	
4	Alfreton Town	34	19	6	9	76	41	+35	44	
5	Bridlington Trinity	34	18	6	10	56	36	+20	42	
6	Mexborough Town Athletic	34	15	10	9	71	45	+26	40	
7	Boston	34	14	8	12	54	47	+7	36	
8	Frickley Colliery	34	10	16	8	50	45	+5	36	Promoted to the Northern Premier League
9	Belper Town	34	14	8	12	36	32	+4	36	
10	Kimberley Town	34	14	6	14	47	56	−9	34	
11	Ilkeston Town	34	12	8	14	52	61	−9	32	
12	Skegness Town	34	11	9	14	41	40	+1	31	
13	Louth United	34	10	10	14	57	60	−3	30	
14	Sutton Town	34	9	12	13	39	46	−7	30	
15	Clifton All Whites	34	5	12	17	37	63	−26	22	
16	Retford Town	34	6	7	21	37	79	−42	19	
17	Heanor Town	34	4	9	21	33	69	−36	17	
18	Ashby Institute	34	4	8	22	28	74	−46	16	

Source: nonleaguematters
Rules for classification: 1) points; 2) goal difference; 3) number of goals scored.
The points system until the 1990–91 season: 2 points for a win, 1 point for a draw and 0 points for losing.

== Division One ==
Midland Football League Division One
- Season: 1975–76
- Champions: Brimington
- Matches: 210
- Goals: 714 (3.4 per match)

=== League table ===
Pos	Team	Pld	W	D	L	GF	GA	GD	Pts	Qualification or relegation
1	Brimington	28	20	4	4	63	18	+45	44	
2	Arnold Kingswell	28	18	6	4	81	26	+55	42	
3	Long Eaton Grange	28	17	8	3	56	22	+34	42	
4	Linby Colliery	28	17	5	6	61	37	+24	39	
5	Staveley Works	28	12	11	5	63	32	+31	35	
6	Oakham United	28	11	5	12	49	45	+4	27	
7	Clifton All Whites reserves	28	11	5	12	43	52	−9	27	
8	Clay Cross Works	28	9	9	10	45	57	−12	27	
9	Eastwood Town reserves	28	9	6	13	29	46	−17	24	
10	Arnold reserves	28	9	5	14	40	54	−14	23	
11	Long Eaton United reserves	28	7	7	14	37	47	−10	21	
12	Sutton Town reserves	28	7	7	14	42	55	−13	21	
13	Belper Town reserves	28	8	5	15	37	62	−25	21	
14	Retford Town reserves	28	7	3	18	39	76	−37	17	Resigned from the league
15	Kimberley Town reserves	28	4	2	22	29	85	−56	10	Resigned from the league

Source: nonleaguematters
Rules for classification: 1) points; 2) goal difference; 3) number of goals scored.
The points system until the 1990–91 season: 2 points for a win, 1 point for a draw and 0 points for losing.
