= 1981–82 Midland Football League =

The 1981–82 Midland Football League was the 82nd and the last in the history of the Midland Football League, a football competition in England.

At the end of the season the league merged with Yorkshire Football League and formed new Northern Counties East Football League. Most of the Midland League clubs were transferred to the Northern Counties East League divisions.

== Premier Division ==
Midland Football League Premier Division
- Season: 1981–82
- Champions: Shepshed Charterhouse
- Matches: 306
- Goals: 818 (2.67 per match)

The Premier Division featured 17 clubs which competed in the previous season, along with one new club:

- Shepshed Charterhouse, joined from the Leicestershire Senior League

=== League table ===
Pos	Team	Pld	W	D	L	GF	GA	GD	Pts	Qualification or relegation
1	Shepshed Charterhouse	34	22	7	5	78	26	+52	51	Joined Northern Counties East League Premier Division
2	Alfreton Town	34	20	7	7	64	24	+40	47	Joined Northern Counties East League Premier Division
3	Eastwood Town	34	19	8	7	62	34	+28	46	Joined Northern Counties East League Premier Division
4	Spalding United	34	14	14	6	49	34	+15	42	Joined Northern Counties East League Premier Division
5	Guisborough Town	34	16	9	9	49	37	+12	41	Joined Northern Counties East League Premier Division
6	Appleby Frodingham	34	16	8	10	53	50	+3	40	Joined Northern Counties East League Premier Division
7	Heanor Town	34	12	15	7	40	32	+8	39	Joined Northern Counties East League Premier Division
8	Mexborough Town Athletic	34	14	8	12	45	41	+4	36	Joined Northern Counties East League Premier Division
9	Boston	34	12	11	11	45	35	+10	35	Joined Northern Counties East League Premier Division
10	Skegness Town	34	12	11	11	32	37	−5	35	Joined Northern Counties East League Premier Division
11	Long Eaton United	34	11	12	11	44	50	−6	34	Joined Northern Counties East League Division One South
12	Belper Town	34	10	13	11	47	49	−2	33	Joined Northern Counties East League Premier Division
13	Bridlington Trinity	34	10	9	15	48	56	−8	29	Joined Northern Counties East League Premier Division
14	Ilkeston Town	34	8	9	17	35	46	−11	25	Joined Northern Counties East League Premier Division
15	Brigg Town	34	6	11	17	30	61	−31	23	Joined Northern Counties East League Division One South
16	Arnold	34	9	4	21	46	74	−28	22	Joined Northern Counties East League Premier Division
17	Sutton Town	34	5	8	21	27	67	−40	18	Joined Northern Counties East League Premier Division
18	Ashby Institute	34	4	8	22	24	65	−41	16	Resigned to the Scunthorpe & District Football League

Source: rsssf
Rules for classification: 1) points; 2) goal difference; 3) number of goals scored.
The points system until the 1990–91 season: 2 points for a win, 1 point for a draw and 0 points for losing.

== Division One ==
Midland Football League Division One
- Season: 1981–82
- Champions: Staveley Works
- Matches: 240
- Goals: 740 (3.08 per match)

Division One featured 14 clubs which competed in the previous season, along with two new clubs:

- Graham Street Prims, joined from the East Midlands Regional League
- Kimberley Town, relegated from the Premier Division

=== League table ===
Pos	Team	Pld	W	D	L	GF	GA	GD	Pts	Qualification or relegation
1	Staveley Works	30	21	7	2	70	18	+52	49	Joined Northern Counties East League Division One South
2	Arnold Kingswell	30	22	5	3	66	22	+44	49	Joined Northern Counties East League Division One South
3	Kimberley Town	30	19	7	4	72	38	+34	45	Joined Northern Counties East League Division One South
4	Rolls Royce (Hucknall)	30	15	7	8	55	38	+17	37	Joined Northern Counties East League Division Two South
5	Oakham United	30	14	5	11	46	37	+9	33	Joined Northern Counties East League Division Two South
6	Sutton Trinity	30	12	9	9	34	30	+4	33	Joined Northern Counties East League Division Two South
7	Graham Street Prims	30	13	6	11	52	41	+11	32	Joined Northern Counties East League Division Two South
8	Creswell Colliery	30	14	3	13	48	50	−2	31	Joined Northern Counties East League Division Two South
9	Arnold reserves	30	12	6	12	50	47	+3	30	
10	Borrowash Victoria	30	10	10	10	41	38	+3	30	Joined Northern Counties East League Division Two South
11	Folk House Old Boys	30	10	8	12	37	51	−14	28	Joined Northern Counties East League Division Two South
12	Attenborough	30	7	5	18	30	57	−27	19	
13	Eastwood Town reserves	30	6	6	18	37	79	−42	18	
14	Long Eaton Grange	30	5	7	18	34	57	−23	17	Joined Northern Counties East League Division Two South
15	Retford Rail	30	4	8	18	35	66	−31	16	Joined Northern Counties East League Division Two South
16	Long Eaton United reserves	30	3	7	20	33	71	−38	13	

Source: rsssf
Rules for classification: 1) points; 2) goal difference; 3) number of goals scored.
The points system until the 1990–91 season: 2 points for a win, 1 point for a draw and 0 points for losing.
