= 1974–75 Midland Football League =

Midland Football League
- Season: 1974–75
- Champions: Boston
- Matches: 306
- Goals: 836 (2.73 per match)

The 1974–75 Midland Football League season was the 75th in the history of the Midland Football League, a football competition in England.

At the end of the season the league introduced second division called Division One, while top division became Premier Division.

== Clubs ==
The league featured 15 clubs which competed in the previous season, along with three new clubs:

- Heanor Town, transferred from the West Midlands (Regional) League
- Louth United, joined from the Lincolnshire League
- Mexborough Town Athletic, joined from the Yorkshire League, for this season only competed in both league, later resigned from the Yorkshire League

== League table ==
Pos	Team	Pld	W	D	L	GF	GA	GR	Pts
1	Boston	34	21	11	2	70	25	2.800	53
2	Eastwood Town	34	23	7	4	67	36	1.861	53
3	Alfreton Town	34	22	6	6	80	40	2.000	50
4	Skegness Town	34	18	11	5	67	37	1.811	47
5	Arnold	34	17	9	8	61	37	1.649	43
6	Mexborough Town Athletic	34	17	5	12	54	48	1.125	39
7	Frickley Colliery	34	12	9	13	52	56	0.929	33
8	Heanor Town	34	11	11	12	41	46	0.891	33
9	Sutton Town	34	11	9	14	44	43	1.023	31
10	Ashby Institute	34	9	13	12	41	46	0.891	31
11	Retford Town	34	9	12	13	32	36	0.889	30
12	Belper Town	34	6	17	11	30	37	0.811	29
13	Ilkeston Town	34	9	11	14	29	49	0.592	29
14	Long Eaton United	34	8	12	14	42	54	0.778	28
15	Kimberley Town	34	8	9	17	38	61	0.623	25
16	Louth United	34	5	10	19	24	62	0.387	20
17	Clifton All Whites	34	4	11	19	33	62	0.532	19
18	Bridlington Trinity	34	6	7	21	31	61	0.508	19

Source: nonleaguematters
Rules for classification: 1) points; 2) goal difference; 3) number of goals scored.
The points system until the 1990–91 season: 2 points for a win, 1 point for a draw and 0 points for losing.
