= East Midlands Regional League =

English football league

The East Midlands Regional League was a football league in the East Midlands region of England between 1967 and 1985. The league was formed in 1967, taking all but four of the clubs from the Premier Division of the Central Alliance. In 1985 it merged with the Central Alliance to form the Midlands Regional Alliance which is now part of the Central Midlands Alliance League.

== List of champions ==
Season	Premier Division	Division One
1967–68	Gresley Rovers	
1968–69	Derby Roe Farm Athletic	Blackwell Miners Welfare
1969–70	Gresley Rovers	Littleover Old Boys
1970–71	Enderby Town	Radcliffe Olympic
1971–72	Enderby Town	Graham Street Prims
1972–73	Ripley Miners Welfare	Clay Cross Works
1973–74	Clay Cross Works	Staveley Works
1974–75	Chesterfield Tube Works	New Villa
1975–76	Chesterfield Tube Works	Staveley Works Reserves
1976–77	Derby Roe Farm Athletic	Church Warsop Welfare
1977–78	Borrowash Victoria	Folk House
1978–79	Graham Street Prims	Mickleover Royal British Legion
1979–80	New Villa	Belper United
1980–81	Mickleover Royal British Legion	Butterley Brick
1981–82	Stanton	Derby Carriage & Wagon
1982–83	Randall Sports	Radford Olympic
1983–84	Eastwood Racing	Ruddington Village
1984–85	Belper United	Oakham United Reserves
Source: Non-League Matters

== Member clubs ==
- Alfreton Town Reserves
- Allenton Athletic
- Allenton Athletic Reserves
- Alvaston Athletic
- Alvaston St. Helen's
- Anstey Nomads
- Anstey Town
- Arnold Kingswell
- Ashbourne Town
- Aspley Old Boys
- Belper Town Reserves
- Belper United
- Blackwell Miners Welfare
- Borrowash Victoria
- Borrowash Victoria Reserves
- Breadsall Amateurs
- Brimington
- Brinsley
- Bulwell Forest Villa
- Butterley Brick
- Chesterfield Tube Works
- Chesterfield Tube Works Reserves
- Church Warsop Welfare
- Clay Cross Miners Welfare
- Clay Cross Works
- Clifton All Whites
- Clifton All Whites Reserves
- Creswell Colliery
- Crewton Sports
- Derby Carriage & Wagon
- Derby Roe Farm
- Derby Roe Farm Athletic Reserves
- Derby Venturers
- Draycott
- Draycott Amateurs
- Eastwood Racing
- Eastwood Town
- Eastwood Town Reserves
- Enderby Town
- Enderby Town Reserves
- Fairham
- Folk House
- Gameworld Villa
- Gotham United
- Graham Street Prims
- Grantham St. John's
- Gresley Rovers
- Harrowby United
- Heanor Town Reserves
- Heeley Amateurs
- Hinckley College
- Holbrook St. Michael's
- Hucknall Colliery Welfare
- Hucknall Masons Arms
- Hucknall Town
- Ilkeston Town Reserves
- International Combustion
- Kimberley Town
- Kimberley Town Reserves
- Kingswell
- LP Sports
- Leicester South End
- Leys & Ewarts
- Linby
- Linby Colliery Welfare
- Littleover British Legion
- Littleover Old Boys
- Long Eaton Grange
- Long Eaton Grange Reserves
- Long Eaton United Reserves
- Loughborough Dynamo
- Loughborough United Reserves
- Mackworth St. Francis
- Meadows Old Boys
- Mickleover Royal British Legion
- Moorgreen Colliery
- New Villa
- New Villa Reserves
- Newark Town
- Newhall United
- Ollerton Colliery
- Pirelli
- Radcliffe Olympic
- Radford Olympic
- Raleigh Athletic
- Randall Sports
- Ransome & Marles
- Ripley Town
- Ripley Town Reserves
- Rolls-Royce & Associates
- Rolls-Royce (Derby)
- Ruddington Village
- Shirebrook Miners Welfare
- Slack & Parr
- Stanton
- Stapleford Old Boys
- Staveley Works
- Staveley Works Reserves
- Sutton Town Reserves
- TI Chesterfield
- Teversal & Silverhill
- Tobruk Hall
- Tollerton Rangers
- West Hallam
- West Hallam Reserves
- Wilmorton & Alvaston
