= Central Alliance =

- Founded: 1911
- First season: 1911–12
- Folded: 1985
- Country: England
- Domestic cup(s): FA Cup

The Central Alliance was a football league in England, covering the East Midlands.

== History ==
The league was established in 1911 with twelve clubs, most of which had previously been members of the Notts & Derbyshire League; Derby County Reserves, Grantham, Grantham Avenue, Ilkeston United, Long Eaton St Helens, Mansfield Mechanics, Mansfield Town, Nottingham Forest Reserves, Peterborough GN Loco, Sutton Junction, Sutton Town and Walsall Reserves.

Following the outbreak of World War I the league was played in two series in 1915–16, with the nine clubs playing each other once; however, three clubs dropped out before the second series, and the remaining six only played nine or ten matches before the league was abandoned. It restarted in 1919–20. However, at the end of the 1924–25 season the league was dissolved, with five clubs joining the Midland League, three joining the Derbyshire Senior League and one joining the Leicestershire Senior League.

In 1947 the league was re-established with 14 clubs. By 1950 it had expanded to the extent that a second division was added. A third division was added in 1956, with Division One split into North and South sections, above Division Two. This system remained in place until 1961 when several clubs moved to the reformed Midland League, and the league reverted to two divisions, a Premier Division and Division One. The following season Division One was divided into A and B sections. However, the two were combined for the 1963–64 season.

The league lost all but four of its Premier Division clubs to the new East Midlands Regional League in 1967. The two leagues subsequently merged to form the Midlands Regional Alliance in 1985 which is now part of the Central Midlands Alliance League.

== Divisional champions ==
Season	Champions		
1911–12	Derby County Reserves		
1912–13	Long Eaton St Helens		
1913–14	Shirebrook		
1914–15	Notts County Reserves		
League abandoned during World War I
1919–20	Mansfield Town		
1920–21	Leicester City Reserves		
1921–22	Leicester City Reserves		
1922–23	Leicester City Reserves		
1923–24	Alfreton Town		
1924–25	Grantham		
Competition abolished
1947–48	Nottingham Forest 'A'		
1948–49	Whitwick Colliery		
1949–50	Linby Colliery		
Season	Division One	Division Two	
1950–51	Sutton Town		
1951–52	Ilkeston Town		
1952–53	Ilkeston Town		
1953–54	Ilkeston Town		
1954–55	Ilkeston Town		
1955–56	Ransome & Marles	Creswell Colliery Reserves	
Season	Division One North	Division One South	Division Two
1956–57	Heanor Town	Skegness Town	Heanor Town Reserves
1957–58	Heanor Town	Skegness Town	Sutton Town Reserves
1958–59	Belper Town	Long Eaton United	Heanor Town Reserves
1959–60	Matlock Town	Bourne Town	Matlock Town Reserves
1960–61	Matlock Town	Skegness Town Reserves	Ransome & Marles
Season	Premier Division	Division One	
1961–62	Boston United	Ilkeston Town Reserves	
Season	Premier Division	Division One A	Division One B
1962–63	Arnold St Mary's	Long Eaton United Reserves	Arnold St Mary's Reserves
Season	Premier Division	Division One	
1963–64	Eastwood Town	Derby County 'A'	
1964–65	Gresley Rovers	Creswell Colliery	
1965–66	Boston	Grantham St John's	
1966–67	Gresley Rovers	Meadows Old Boys	
1967–68		Derby Roe Farm Athletic	
1968–69	Littleover Old Boys	St Helens United	
1969–70	Radcliffe Olympic	Clifton All Whites Reserves	
1970–71	Graham Street Prims	Hucknall Miners Association	
1971–72	Heage United		
1972–73	Hucknall Miners Association	Greenwood	
1973–74	Derby Roe Farm Athletic Reserves	Ruddington Village	
1974–75	Fairham	New Villa	
1975–76	Attenborough	Birnam Sports	
1976–77			
1977–78	Derby Carriage & Wagon		
1978–79			
1979–80	Priory		
1980–81	Radcliffe Olympic		
1981–82		Slack & Parr	
1982–83			
1983–84			
1984–85			
