= 2025–26 United Counties League =

United Counties League
- Season: 2025–26

The 2025–26 season is the 119th in the history of the United Counties League, a football competition in England. The United Counties League operates three divisions in the English football league system, the Premier Divisions North and South at Step 5 and Division One at Step 6.

The allocations for Steps 5 and 6 this season were announced by The Football Association on 15 May 2025.

== Premier Division North ==
United Counties League Premier Division North
- Season: 2025–26
- Champions: Boston Town
- Promoted: Boston Town
- Relegated: Heanor Town; Harrowby United
- Matches: 379
- Goals: 1,222 (3.22 per match)
- Top goalscorer: (England) Matthew Cotton (Boston Town) (23 goals)
- Biggest home win: Boston Town 7–0 Blackstones (20 September 2025)
- Biggest away win: Hucknall Town 0–5 Sherwood Colliery (3 September 2025); Harrowby United 0–5 Boston Town (4 October 2025); Kimberley Miners Welfare 2–7 Sherwood Colliery (4 November 2025); Blackstones 0–5 Clay Cross Town (17 January 2026)
- Highest scoring: Eastwood 7–5 Kimberley Miners Welfare (27 December 2025)
- All statistics correct as of 31 January 2026.

At the end of the 2024–25 season, four teams left the division:

- Bourne Town, promoted to the Northern Premier League Division One Midlands
- Lincoln United, promoted to the Northern Premier League Division One East
- Shirebrook Town, relegated to Division One
- Sleaford Town, relegated to Division One

Before the 2025–26 season, four teams joined the division:

- Blackstones, promoted from Division One
- Clay Cross Town, promoted from Division One
- Grantham Town, relegated from the Northern Premier League Division One Midlands
- Sherwood Colliery, relegated from the Northern Premier League Division One East

=== League table ===
Pos	Team	Pld	W	D	L	GF	GA	GD	Pts	Promotion, qualification or relegation
1	Boston Town (C, P)	38	25	6	7	94	39	+55	81	Promoted to the Northern Premier League Division One Midlands
2	Sherwood Colliery	38	23	8	7	95	50	+45	77	Qualified for the play-offs
3	Grantham Town (O, P)	38	21	11	6	73	39	+34	74	Qualified for the play-offs
4	Belper United	38	23	3	12	76	54	+22	72	Qualified for the play-offs
5	Newark Town	38	21	6	11	83	57	+26	69	Qualified for the play-offs
6	AFC Mansfield	38	19	7	12	69	48	+21	64	
7	Eastwood	38	18	8	12	58	49	+9	62	
8	Hucknall Town	38	16	7	15	58	62	−4	55	
9	Clay Cross Town	38	16	6	16	77	62	+15	54	
10	Gresley Rovers	38	16	5	17	50	55	−5	53	
11	Skegness Town	38	13	9	16	57	75	−18	48	
12	Melton Town	38	14	5	19	55	71	−16	47	Resigned to the Leicestershire Senior League Premier Division
13	Ashby Ivanhoe	38	12	7	19	66	67	−1	43	
14	Kimberley Miners Welfare	38	12	6	20	56	69	−13	42	
15	Wisbech Town	38	11	9	18	45	64	−19	42	Transferred to the Eastern Counties League Premier Division
16	Deeping Rangers	38	12	6	20	44	68	−24	42	
17	Blackstones	38	11	6	21	40	70	−30	39	
18	Newark and Sherwood United	38	10	8	20	42	57	−15	38	Resigned to the Nottinghamshire League Premier Division
19	Heanor Town	38	10	7	21	51	71	−20	37	Reprieved from relegation
20	Harrowby United (R)	38	9	6	23	34	96	−62	30 (Note: On 11 February 2026, Harrowby United were deducted 3 points for fielding an ineligible player in the match vs. Newark Town on 6 December 2025.)	Relegated to Division One

Source: The FA Full-Time
Rules for classification: 1) points; 2) goal difference; 3) number of goals scored; 4) number of matches won; 5) head-to-head results
(C) Champions; (O) Play-off winners; (P) Promoted; (R) Relegated

=== Play-offs ===
Semi-finals
2	Sherwood Colliery	0
5	Newark Town	1
3	Grantham Town	3
4	Belper United	2

Final
3	Grantham Town	2
5	Newark Town	0

==== Semifinals ====
25 April 2026	Sherwood Colliery	0–1	Newark Town	Mansfield Woodhouse
15:00		Report	Allcock 44'	Stadium: Debdale Park; Attendance: 452; Referee: Wayne Mason

25 April 2026	Grantham Town	3–2	Belper United	Grantham
15:00	Roberts 48'; Stainfield 79'; Johnson 83'	Report	Bryant 29'; Ramsey 56'	Stadium: South Kesteven Sports Stadium; Attendance: 574; Referee: Ben Hopton

==== Final ====
2 May 2026	Grantham Town	2–0	Newark Town	Grantham
15:00	Johnson 47'; Stainfield 55'	Report		Stadium: South Kesteven Sports Stadium; Attendance: 1,616; Referee: Jake Bloom

=== Results table ===
Home \ Away	MAN	ASH	BEL	BLA	BOS	CCT	DEE	EAS	GRA	GRE	HAR	HEA	HUC	KMW	MEL	N&S	NWT	SWC	SKE	WIS
AFC Mansfield	—	3–1	1–0	2–1	0–1	1–2	3–2	1–1	1–1	2–0	3–3	2–0	2–2	0–2	2–1	1–0	5–1	1–1	4–2	0–1
Ashby Ivanhoe	0–2	—	4–1	1–2	1–2	0–2	1–4	1–3	2–1	0–1	1–1	1–2	2–3	1–1	5–1	4–3	1–3	3–0	4–0	3–1
Belper United	1–0	0–3	—	2–0	2–2	1–0	2–0	3–3	2–3	2–1	2–3	3–0	1–4	2–1	4–1	3–1	4–2	1–2	4–0	2–0
Blackstones	2–1	3–0	0–1	—	1–2	0–5	1–2	2–0	0–0	3–0	1–1	1–3	0–1	1–0	0–2	0–3	4–3	2–2	1–2	0–4
Boston Town	3–1	3–2	4–1	7–0	—	3–4	2–0	2–0	0–1	1–3	6–0	2–2	6–0	1–0	3–1	1–0	2–1	4–0	4–0	7–2
Clay Cross Town	2–3	2–2	1–2	2–1	0–2	—	4–2	1–2	1–2	2–0	5–0	1–4	2–0	1–2	4–1	2–1	0–8	2–2	4–0	3–0
Deeping Rangers	0–3	1–0	0–0	0–0	1–1	1–0	—	1–4	1–0	1–1	4–0	3–0	0–1	0–3	0–1	1–2	1–0	3–2	1–1	1–2
Eastwood	0–2	3–2	1–0	0–0	1–1	4–2	3–1	—	1–0	2–0	4–1	1–0	0–2	7–5	1–3	1–1	0–2	3–2	2–1	3–0
Grantham Town	2–0	2–0	4–1	6–1	0–0	2–0	2–1	1–1	—	4–2	4–0	3–2	1–1	3–1	1–0	1–0	1–1	3–3	5–2	1–1
Gresley Rovers	0–3	0–2	0–1	2–1	2–0	2–1	4–0	1–0	0–1	—	2–1	1–2	5–1	0–3	2–1	0–0	0–1	1–5	3–2	2–0
Harrowby United	0–5	1–5	0–7	0–0	0–5	0–7	0–1	2–0	0–1	1–1	—	2–0	0–4	1–0	1–0	4–1	0–2	0–2	2–3	0–0
Heanor Town	0–4	1–2	0–2	1–2	5–2	1–4	5–2	3–1	0–1	0–2	0–1	—	2–1	2–0	2–2	1–2	1–2	1–2	1–3	1–1
Hucknall Town	2–0	2–2	0–1	0–1	1–3	2–2	1–1	1–0	1–3	3–1	2–0	1–2	—	1–2	2–4	2–0	0–1	0–5	1–1	3–3
Kimberley Miners Welfare	3–1	2–2	3–2	1–2	2–3	1–2	1–0	0–0	2–2	1–1	1–3	3–1	0–2	—	1–2	1–1	2–0	2–7	0–2	1–2
Melton Town	2–2	3–2	0–2	2–1	0–3	3–2	5–1	0–1	3–2	0–3	4–1	0–0	1–2	0–3	—	5–3	0–4	0–1	3–1	3–2
Newark and Sherwood United	2–1	1–1	0–2	2–0	0–1	1–1	2–2	0–1	0–3	0–1	3–0	2–0	0–4	0–1	1–1	—	1–2	2–0	2–0	3–0
Newark Town	4–0	2–0	1–4	2–1	0–1	3–2	3–1	1–0	3–3	1–3	0–1	2–2	3–2	7–2	1–0	2–2	—	1–1	4–1	0–0
Sherwood Colliery	2–2	3–2	1–4	3–1	2–1	0–0	6–0	2–3	2–1	5–2	4–1	4–1	4–0	2–0	3–0	3–0	2–1	—	5–0	1–0
Skegness Town	0–2	1–2	6–1	3–1	0–0	3–2	1–2	1–1	2–2	1–0	4–2	2–2	1–1	1–0	0–0	2–0	3–5	1–1	—	2–0
Wisbech Town	1–3	1–1	2–3	2–3	2–1	0–0	0–2	1–0	1–0	1–1	2–1	1–1	0–1	4–3	2–0	2–0	2–3	1–3	1–2	—

Source: FA Full-Time Grid
Legend: Blue = home team win; Yellow = draw; Red = away team win.
For upcoming matches, an "a" indicates there is an article about the rivalry between the two participants.

=== Stadia and locations ===
Location of the clubs in the 2025–26 United Counties League Premier Division North
Location of the clubs in the 2025–26 United Counties League Premier Division North (Nottinghamshire)

Club	Location	Stadium	Capacity
AFC Mansfield	Mansfield (Forest Town)	Forest Town Stadium	
Ashby Ivanhoe	Ashby-de-la-Zouch	NFU Sports Ground	
Belper United	Eastwood	Coronation Park	
Eastwood	Eastwood	Coronation Park	
Blackstones	Stamford	Lincoln Road	1,000
Boston Town	Boston	Tattershall Road	6,000
Clay Cross Town	Clay Cross	Mill Lane	
Deeping Rangers	Market Deeping	Haydon Whitham Stadium	2,000
Grantham Town	Grantham	South Kesteven Sports Stadium	7,500
Gresley Rovers	Church Gresley	Moat Ground	2,400
Harrowby United	Grantham	Dickens Road	
Heanor Town	Heanor	Town Ground	2,700
Hucknall Town	Hucknall	RM Stadium	4,000
Kimberley Miners Welfare	Kimberley	Stag Ground	
Melton Town	Melton Mowbray	Melton Sports Village	
Newark and Sherwood United	Grantham	Dickens Road	
Newark Town	Newark-on-Trent	YMCA Sports Village	
Sherwood Colliery	Mansfield Woodhouse	Debdale Park	1,000
Skegness Town	Skegness	Vertigo Stadium	
Wisbech Town	Wisbech	Fenland Stadium	1,118

== Premier Division South ==
United Counties League Premier Division South
- Season: 2025–26
- Champions: Nuneaton Town
- Promoted: Nuneaton Town
- Relegated: Bugbrooke St Michaels; GNG Oadby Town F.C.
- Matches: 380
- Goals: 1,300 (3.42 per match)
- Top goalscorer: (England) Kyle Jardine (Nuneaton Town) (25 goals)
- Biggest home win: Coventry United 9–0 GNG Oadby Town (11 February 2026)
- Biggest away win: GNG Oadby Town 0–6 Newport Pagnell Town (13 September 2025); Leicester Nirvana 0–6 March Town United (1 November 2025)
- Highest scoring: Hinckley 8–2 Easington Sports (13 September 2025)
- All statistics correct as of 6 March 2026.

At the end of the 2024–25 season, two teams left the division:

- St Neots Town, promoted to the Northern Premier League Division One Midlands
- Rugby Borough, promoted to the Northern Premier League Division One East

Before the 2025–26 season, three teams joined the division:

- Atherstone Town, transferred from the Midland League Premier Division
- Moulton, promoted from the Spartan South Midlands Football League Division One
- Nuneaton Town, promoted from the Midland League Division One

=== League table ===
Pos	Team	Pld	W	D	L	GF	GA	GD	Pts	Promotion, qualification or relegation
1	Nuneaton Town (C, P)	38	27	7	4	93	36	+57	88	Promoted to the Northern Premier League Division One Midlands
2	Coventry United (O, P)	38	26	6	6	92	28	+64	84	Qualified for the play-offs
3	Atherstone Town	38	24	7	7	76	41	+35	79	Qualified for the play-offs
4	March Town United	38	22	9	7	80	35	+45	75	Qualified for the play-offs, then transferred to the Eastern Counties League Premier Division
5	Aylestone Park	38	20	9	9	86	59	+27	69	Qualified for the play-offs, then transferred to the Premier Division North
6	Lutterworth Town	38	19	7	12	72	40	+32	64	
7	Histon	38	18	10	10	75	58	+17	64	
8	Moulton	38	17	6	15	63	65	−2	57	
9	Newport Pagnell Town	38	17	5	16	81	63	+18	56	Transferred to the Spartan South Midlands League Premier Division
10	Eynesbury Rovers	38	17	6	15	67	58	+9	54 (Note: On 26 January 2026, Eynesbury Rovers were deducted 3 points for fielding an ineligible player in the match vs. Histon on 27 December 2025.)	
11	Hinckley	38	15	5	18	80	69	+11	50	Transferred to the Premier Division North
12	Northampton ON Chenecks	38	15	5	18	58	64	−6	50	
13	Leicester Nirvana	38	14	8	16	57	70	−13	50	Transferred to the Premier Division North
14	Daventry Town	38	13	7	18	53	66	−13	46	
15	Godmanchester Rovers	38	12	10	16	50	70	−20	46	
16	Easington Sports	38	9	8	21	53	89	−36	35	Transferred to the Combined Counties League Premier Division North
17	Northampton Sileby Rangers	38	8	8	22	46	83	−37	32	
18	Yaxley	38	7	5	26	37	99	−62	26	
19	Bugbrooke St Michaels (R)	38	7	2	29	36	79	−43	23	Relegated to the Spartan South Midlands League Division One
20	GNG Oadby Town (R)	38	6	4	28	45	128	−83	22	Relegated to the Midland League Division One

Source: The FA Full-Time
Rules for classification: 1) points; 2) goal difference; 3) number of goals scored; 4) number of matches won; 5) head-to-head results
(C) Champions; (O) Play-off winners; (P) Promoted; (R) Relegated

=== Play-offs ===
Semi-finals
2	Coventry United	4
5	Aylestone Park	1
3	Atherstone Town	2
4	March Town United	1

Final
2	Coventry United	2
3	Atherstone Town	0

==== Semifinals ====
25 April 2026	Coventry United	4–1	Aylestone Park	Coventry
15:00	Faulkner 4', 46'; Adomako 8'; Dunn 37'	Report	Armeni 72'	Stadium: Nick Newbold Stadium; Attendance: 266; Referee: Kieran Fitzpatrick

25 April 2026	Atherstone Town	2–1	March Town United	Atherstone
15:00	Collins; Smith	Report	Foy	Stadium: Sheepy Road; Attendance: 550; Referee: Ellis Mills

==== Final ====
4 May 2026	Coventry United	2–0 (a.e.t.)	Atherstone Town	Coventry
15:00	Dunn 93', 105+2'	Report		Stadium: Nick Newbold Stadium; Attendance: 750; Referee: James Truman

=== Results table ===
Home \ Away	ATH	AYP	BSM	CVU	DAV	EAS	EYN	GNG	GOD	HIN	HIS	LEI	LUT	MTU	MOU	NPT	NOC	NSR	NUN	YAX
Atherstone Town	—	2–1	3–0	1–0	2–2	4–1	4–1	2–0	4–1	1–0	0–2	6–0	0–3	0–1	3–0	3–1	1–2	4–3	1–2	2–0
Aylestone Park	2–2	—	3–1	1–1	0–1	5–1	2–2	3–2	2–1	1–0	1–4	3–2	0–5	2–2	0–1	2–2	3–1	4–2	1–1	6–1
Bugbrooke St Michaels	0–2	0–3	—	0–0	2–1	0–1	0–1	2–1	0–2	0–3	1–2	1–1	3–1	3–1	3–2	2–3	0–3	0–1	0–1	5–0
Coventry United	5–1	0–1	2–1	—	2–0	6–0	2–1	9–0	1–1	2–1	5–1	2–1	1–1	2–1	5–1	2–1	5–0	3–0	3–0	5–1
Daventry Town	2–2	0–4	3–1	0–2	—	0–1	1–4	3–0	3–1	6–0	0–4	1–2	0–0	0–1	2–1	2–1	H/W	3–0	2–3	1–0
Easington Sports	2–1	2–2	1–2	1–0	3–3	—	1–4	2–2	2–2	1–2	0–2	2–2	3–4	0–5	0–1	1–3	0–3	1–1	3–0	1–1
Eynesbury Rovers	0–1	0–2	1–0	3–3	2–1	0–0	—	8–0	0–0	0–3	1–1	0–2	2–0	1–2	4–3	1–0	2–0	1–2	2–5	1–0
GNG Oadby Town	1–3	1–4	2–1	2–3	0–2	1–4	4–3	—	0–4	2–3	0–5	3–1	0–12	0–3	2–2	0–6	1–2	1–2	0–2	4–4
Godmanchester Rovers	2–4	0–2	2–1	1–3	0–2	1–4	2–6	1–4	—	4–2	2–2	0–3	1–0	0–1	0–3	2–1	2–0	1–0	2–2	H/W
Hinckley	0–1	2–2	4–1	0–2	5–0	8–2	0–1	7–0	3–3	—	3–3	2–3	1–2	2–5	1–5	3–4	3–1	1–1	1–2	5–2
Histon	0–0	4–2	3–0	0–1	1–1	5–3	3–4	5–3	0–0	2–2	—	2–1	2–4	2–2	0–2	2–0	2–0	2–1	1–3	3–2
Leicester Nirvana	1–2	3–0	3–2	0–0	3–3	0–2	1–0	2–1	3–1	1–3	0–0	—	0–2	0–6	2–0	4–3	1–1	2–2	1–2	3–1
Lutterworth Town	0–2	1–2	3–0	0–2	2–0	2–1	0–2	12–0	3–0	1–3	1–0	1–0	—	0–0	3–0	1–2	4–3	3–0	0–0	4–0
March Town United	1–1	1–1	4–0	0–1	4–1	3–0	2–1	1–2	0–0	1–0	3–0	3–0	1–0	—	2–1	2–3	2–0	3–1	0–0	4–0
Moulton	1–1	2–6	1–0	3–1	3–2	2–1	2–0	2–1	1–1	1–0	1–3	4–0	0–2	1–1	—	2–1	2–4	1–1	0–4	3–1
Newport Pagnell Town	0–0	4–3	4–1	0–2	4–0	1–0	4–2	5–0	4–0	0–2	1–3	3–1	1–1	3–3	1–1	—	1–3	3–1	0–1	7–0
Northampton ON Chenecks	1–2	0–3	3–2	1–0	0–0	6–2	1–3	3–1	0–2	0–1	4–1	2–2	1–0	3–1	0–3	3–2	—	0–0	1–3	3–1
Northampton Sileby Rangers	3–4	1–3	3–1	0–5	0–2	2–0	3–1	2–2	2–3	2–3	3–1	1–3	2–2	0–1	1–5	0–1	2–1	—	0–3	1–1
Nuneaton Town	0–2	4–2	4–0	2–1	2–1	2–1	1–1	4–1	2–2	3–1	0–1	3–0	2–2	3–1	5–0	4–0	3–1	4–0	—	6–1
Yaxley	0–2	0–2	1–0	0–3	4–2	1–3	0–1	0–1	0–3	1–0	1–1	0–3	3–1	1–6	1–0	3–1	1–1	4–0	0–5	—

Source: FA Full-Time Grid
Legend: Blue = home team win; Yellow = draw; Red = away team win.
For upcoming matches, an "a" indicates there is an article about the rivalry between the two participants.

=== Stadia and locations ===
Location of the clubs in the 2025–26 United Counties League Premier Division South

Club	Location	Stadium	Capacity
Atherstone Town	Atherstone	Sheepy Road	
Aylestone Park	Leicester	Saffron Lane	1,128
Bugbrooke St Michaels	Bugbrooke	Birds Close	2,500
Coventry United	Coventry	Nick Newbold Stadium (Note: home of Coventry Rugby Club (groundshare))	4,000
Daventry Town	Daventry	Elderstubbs	1,855
Easington Sports	Banbury (Easington)	Addison Road	
Eynesbury Rovers	Eynesbury	Alfred Hall Memorial Ground	
GNG Oadby Town	Leicester	Riverside	3,000
Godmanchester Rovers	Godmanchester	Bearscroft Lane	
Hinckley	Barwell	Kirkby Road	2,500
Histon	Impington	Bridge Road	4,300
Leicester Nirvana	Leicester	Hamilton Park	
Lutterworth Town	Lutterworth	Dunley Way	
March Town United	March	GER Sports Ground	
Moulton	Moulton	Brunting Road	
Newport Pagnell Town	Newport Pagnell	Willen Road	2,000
Northampton ON Chenecks	Northampton	Old Northamptonians Sports Ground	
Northampton Sileby Rangers	Northampton	Fernie Fields	
Nuneaton Town	Nuneaton	The Oval	4,614
Yaxley	Yaxley	Leading Drove	1,000

== Division One ==
United Counties League Division One
- Season: 2025–26
- Champions: Retford
- Promoted: Retford
- Matches: 506
- Goals: 1,706 (3.37 per match)
- Top goalscorer: (England) Lewis Chambers (Retford United) (35 goals)
- Biggest home win: Gedling Miners Welfare 7–0 Rainworth Miners Welfare (26 July 2025); Retford United 9–2 Sandiacre Town (9 August 2025); South Normanton Athletic 7–0 Rainworth Miners Welfare (19 August 2025); Coalville Town 7–0 Gedling Miners Welfare (22 November 2025)
- Biggest away win: Rainworth Miners Welfare 0–9 Retford (18 October 2025); Rainworth Miners Welfare 0–9 Clifton All Whites (24 February 2026)
- Highest scoring: Retford United 9–2 Sandiacre Town (9 August 2025)
- All statistics correct as of 6 March 2026.

At the end of the 2024–25 season, three teams left the division:

- Blackstones, promoted to the Premier Division North
- Clay Cross Town, promoted to the Premier Division North
- Selston, relegated to the Central Midlands Alliance

Before the 2025–26 season, seven teams joined the division:

- Dronfield Town, transferred from the Northern Counties East League
- FCV Grace Dieu, promoted from the Nottinghamshire Senior League
- Pinchbeck United, transferred from the Eastern Counties Football League
- Shirebrook Town, relegated from Premier Division North
- Sleaford Town, relegated from Premier Division North
- South Normanton Athletic, promoted from the Central Midlands Alliance League
- Swallownest, transferred from the Northern Counties East League

=== League table ===
Pos	Team	Pld	W	D	L	GF	GA	GD	Pts	Promotion, qualification or relegation
1	Retford (C, P)	44	34	6	4	116	34	+82	108	Promoted to the Northern Counties East League Premier Division
2	Retford United (O, P)	44	31	10	3	131	33	+98	103	Qualified for the play-offs, then Promoted to the Northern Counties East League Premier Division
3	Stapleford Town	44	27	8	9	103	67	+36	89	Qualified for the play-offs
4	Coalville Town	44	28	10	6	95	41	+54	82 (Note: On 11 February 2026, Coalville Town were deducted 3 points for fielding an ineligible player in the match vs. Holwell Sports on 18 November 2025. They were later deducted a further 9 points.)	Qualified for the play-offs, then transferred to the Midland League Division One
5	Staveley Miners Welfare	44	25	7	12	88	48	+40	82	Qualified for the play-offs
6	FCV Grace Dieu	44	22	15	7	93	49	+44	81	Transferred to the Midland League Division One
7	South Normanton Athletic	44	23	11	10	89	54	+35	80	
8	Dronfield Town	44	18	10	16	75	78	−3	64	
9	Clifton All Whites	44	19	6	19	80	91	−11	63	
10	Sandiacre Town	44	18	8	18	66	64	+2	62	
11	Pinxton	44	18	7	19	77	77	0	61	
12	Dunkirk	44	16	11	17	73	76	−3	59	
13	Southwell City	44	15	11	18	65	71	−6	56	
14	Swallownest	44	14	8	22	64	82	−18	50	
15	West Bridgford	44	14	8	22	60	85	−25	50	
16	Clipstone	44	15	5	24	67	90	−23	47 (Note: On 25 February 2026, Clipstone were deducted 3 points for fielding an ineligible player in the match vs. Rainworth Miners Welfare on 27 December 2025.)	
17	Shirebrook Town	44	12	9	23	53	84	−31	45	
18	Radford	44	9	15	20	55	73	−18	42	
19	Sleaford Town	44	11	9	24	55	80	−25	42	
20	Holwell Sports	44	11	9	24	65	99	−34	42	Transferred to the Midland League Division One
21	Pinchbeck United	44	9	14	21	51	80	−29	41	Reprived from relegation
22	Gedling Miners Welfare	44	9	8	27	60	106	−46	35	Reprived from relegation
23	Rainworth Miners Welfare (R)	44	3	5	36	25	144	−119	14	Relegated to the Nottinghamshire League Premier Division

Source: The FA Full-Time
Rules for classification: 1) points; 2) goal difference; 3) number of goals scored; 4) number of matches won; 5) head-to-head results
(C) Champions; (O) Play-off winners; (P) Promoted; (R) Relegated

=== Play-offs ===
Semi-finals
2	Retford United	1
5	Staveley Miners Welfare	0
4	Stapleford Town	0
3	Coalville Town	1

Final
2	Retford United	3 (4)
3	Coalville Town	3 (1)

==== Semifinals ====
25 April 2026	Retford United	1–0	Staveley Miners Welfare	Retford
15:00	Buckthorp 2'	Report		Stadium: Cannon Park; Attendance: 380; Referee: Christopher Parkinson

25 April 2026	Stapleford Town	0–1	Coalville Town	Stapleford
15:00		Report	Morley 37'	Stadium: Hickings Lane; Attendance: 547; Referee: Liam Vayro

==== Final ====
2 May 2026	Retford United	3–3 (a.e.t.) (4–1 p)	Coalville Town	Retford
15:00 GMT	Wilson 39'; Duggan 53'; Chambers 112'	Report	Green 56'; Sahota 57'; Alcock 107'	Stadium: Cannon Park; Attendance: 1,007; Referee: Mason Bussey
	Penalties
	Devereux (penalty scored); Kolodynski (penalty scored); Orange (penalty scored); Chambers (penalty scored)		McManus (penalty missed); Semahimbo (penalty scored); Mangan (penalty missed)

=== Results table ===
Home \ Away	CAW	CLP	COA	DRO	DUN	GRD	GMW	HWS	PNB	PNX	RAD	RMW	RTF	RFU	SAN	SHI	SLE	SNA	SWC	STP	SMW	SWA	WES
Clifton All Whites	—	1–4	1–4	0–2	0–2	0–6	4–1	3–2	2–0	0–4	3–1	4–1	1–2	1–1	1–0	2–2	2–1	0–4	2–1	1–4	0–3	4–2	2–1
Clipstone	0–0	—	2–3	2–1	3–2	2–0	0–2	4–2	0–1	2–1	3–2	1–1	0–3	1–2	0–6	0–1	0–1	3–1	0–2	0–1	1–4	3–3	1–0
Coalville Town	2–1	1–5	—	0–0	1–0	4–0	7–0	3–1	0–0	4–2	4–2	0–0	3–2	1–1	4–1	2–0	3–2	3–1	5–0	1–2	1–1	3–0	4–0
Dronfield Town	0–2	3–2	1–0	—	4–1	0–2	1–1	5–0	1–1	3–0	1–3	2–1	1–2	2–2	1–1	1–1	3–1	0–3	0–6	0–5	2–1	4–2	2–0
Dunkirk	2–1	6–0	0–2	0–3	—	2–2	4–1	4–2	2–0	1–1	3–3	2–0	0–4	0–2	1–2	1–1	3–0	1–2	1–1	1–1	2–3	1–0	2–1
FCV Grace Dieu	2–2	3–3	2–0	2–2	1–1	—	4–3	2–0	0–0	8–2	1–0	4–2	0–1	0–0	0–2	3–0	4–4	1–0	5–0	1–0	1–1	0–1	4–0
Gedling Miners Welfare	2–2	3–4	1–1	1–2	1–1	0–4	—	2–0	3–4	0–1	0–2	7–0	0–3	0–6	0–0	2–2	3–1	0–5	2–3	0–2	1–2	2–5	2–2
Holwell Sports	4–1	4–3	2–3	3–1	1–4	0–5	3–5	—	4–1	1–3	3–3	4–0	1–1	0–6	1–1	1–2	0–3	1–3	1–3	2–1	0–1	2–3	0–1
Pinchbeck United	1–0	2–3	0–0	2–2	2–2	0–2	0–0	2–0	—	4–1	0–0	4–0	0–3	1–5	0–1	2–5	1–1	0–1	0–0	1–2	1–1	1–3	4–1
Pinxton	1–4	3–2	3–1	2–2	1–2	1–3	7–1	1–2	2–1	—	1–1	1–2	2–1	1–1	0–1	5–0	4–1	1–0	3–3	3–1	2–1	1–1	2–1
Radford	4–4	0–1	0–1	3–3	1–2	2–2	1–2	0–0	1–1	2–0	—	3–0	1–2	1–1	2–0	3–1	1–0	1–1	0–1	1–2	0–1	0–1	1–0
Rainworth Miners Welfare	0–9	0–2	0–4	0–1	0–4	0–2	1–4	1–2	1–5	3–1	1–2	—	0–9	2–4	0–6	2–1	1–2	0–3	0–2	0–6	0–1	1–2	0–3
Retford	6–0	2–1	0–1	4–3	5–0	1–1	4–1	4–1	3–1	3–1	2–1	4–0	—	0–2	1–0	6–1	2–1	0–0	1–1	3–1	2–1	2–1	5–0
Retford United	4–1	4–0	3–0	7–1	5–1	0–1	2–1	0–0	6–1	3–1	4–0	3–0	2–2	—	9–2	3–0	4–2	0–0	2–0	4–0	3–0	3–0	1–0
Sandiacre Town	2–3	2–1	1–2	0–1	0–0	3–1	1–0	1–1	3–0	0–2	3–0	3–1	1–1	1–4	—	0–1	4–0	2–1	2–1	0–2	0–0	0–4	1–3
Shirebrook Town	1–3	2–1	0–3	2–1	3–2	0–2	1–0	0–2	1–1	2–3	1–1	4–1	A/W	1–1	0–1	—	4–3	1–3	0–3	0–1	1–1	2–0	2–0
Sleaford Town	1–2	3–0	0–2	0–4	1–0	1–1	2–0	2–2	0–3	1–0	2–1	0–0	2–5	0–2	3–1	3–1	—	1–2	0–0	0–1	0–1	1–3	1–1
South Normanton Athletic	2–3	2–1	2–2	3–2	3–1	1–1	3–0	1–1	3–1	0–3	1–1	7–0	0–3	2–1	2–1	2–0	2–0	—	2–2	1–1	4–0	3–2	0–2
Southwell City	3–2	1–1	0–1	0–2	1–2	0–3	0–2	1–0	3–0	1–2	4–0	1–1	0–2	0–3	2–2	2–2	2–1	2–2	—	1–2	2–1	1–0	2–0
Stapleford Town	1–3	1–0	1–1	3–1	3–3	3–3	3–1	2–5	3–0	4–1	5–1	3–0	0–4	3–2	4–2	6–2	3–2	6–3	6–2	—	0–6	3–1	3–2
Staveley Miners Welfare	2–1	3–2	2–0	5–1	3–1	1–2	1–0	4–0	5–0	1–0	2–2	7–1	0–2	1–2	1–0	2–1	0–3	0–1	2–1	1–1	—	4–0	6–2
Swallownest	2–0	1–2	2–2	0–2	0–2	3–1	2–3	1–2	2–2	1–0	0–0	1–1	1–2	1–4	3–4	2–1	1–1	1–5	3–2	0–0	1–0	—	0–1
West Bridgford	1–2	0–5	1–2	2–1	5–1	1–1	3–0	2–2	2–0	1–1	3–1	4–0	0–2	1–7	0–2	1–0	1–1	2–2	3–2	1–1	1–5	4–2	—

Source: FA Full-Time Grid
Legend: Blue = home team win; Yellow = draw; Red = away team win.
For upcoming matches, an "a" indicates there is an article about the rivalry between the two participants.

=== Stadia and locations ===
Location of the clubs in the 2025–26 United Counties League Division One
Location of the clubs in the 2025–26 United Counties League Division One (Nottinghamshire)

Club	Location	Stadium	Capacity
Clifton All Whites	Nottingham (Clifton)	Green Lane	
Clipstone	Clipstone	Lido Ground	
Coalville Town	Coalville	The Mander Cruickshank Stadium	
Dronfield Town	Dronfield	Stonelow Ground	500
Dunkirk	Nottingham (Dunkirk)	Lenton Lane	
FCV Grace Dieu	Thringstone	FCV Academy, Grace Dieu Manor Park	
Gedling Miners Welfare	Gedling	Plains Road	
Holwell Sports	Asfordby Hill	Welby Road	1,000
Pinchbeck United	Pinchbeck	Sir Halley Stewart Field	2,700
Pinxton	Pinxton	The Welfare Ground	
Radford	Nottingham (Radford)	Selhurst Street	
Rainworth Miners Welfare	Rainworth	Welfare Ground	
Retford	Retford	The Rail	1,000
Retford United	Retford	Cannon Park	2,000
Sandiacre Town	Sandiacre	St Giles Park	
Shirebrook Town	Shirebrook	Langwith Road	2,000
Sleaford Town	Sleaford	Eslaforde Park	1,000
South Normanton Athletic	South Normanton	Lees Lane	3,000
Southwell City	Southwell	Centenary Ground, Brinkley	
Stapleford Town	Stapleford, Nottinghamshire	Hickings Lane	
Staveley Miners Welfare	Staveley	Inkersall Road	5,000
Swallownest	Swallownest	(The Swall Siro) Miners Welfare Ground	500
West Bridgford	West Bridgford	Regatta Way	

== League Cup ==
2025–26 United Counties League Cup
Tournament details
- Country: England
- Teams: 63

Final positions
- Champions: Moulton (1st title)
- Runners-up: Nuneaton Town

Quarter-finals

20 February 2026	Hinckley (PS)	2–3	Moulton (PS)	Barwell
19:45	Baker; Pegg	Report	Falcini 7', 45'	Stadium: Kirkby Road; Attendance: 164; Referee: David Brennan

21 February 2026	Nuneaton Town (PS)	3–3 (a.e.t.) (7–6 p)	Grantham Town (PN)	Bedworth
15:00	Jardine 24', 68'; Williams 90+6'	Report	Roberts 20'; Shaw 90+3'	Stadium: The Oval; Attendance: 417; Referee: Jack Simpson

21 February 2026	Kimberley Miners Welfare (PN)	3–2	Clay Cross Town (PN)	Ilkeston
15:00	Lambert 36'; Nangle 48'; Timson 67'	Report	Clegg 14'; Marshall 84'	Stadium: Awsworth Road; Attendance: 136; Referee: Corey Green

21 February 2026	Coalville Town (D1)	1–0	Eastwood (PN)	Coalville
15:00	Semahimbo 75'	Report		Stadium: Owen Street; Attendance: 355; Referee: Adam Orchiston

Semi-finals

17 March 2026	Nuneaton Town (PS)	1–5	Coalville Town (D1)	Bedworth
19:45	Jardine 22'; Jones (red card) 90+2'	Report	Morley 8', 14', 45'; Carter 39', 42'	Stadium: The Oval; Attendance: 537; Referee: Daniel Miller

18 April 2026	Gresley Rovers (PN)	0–1	Moulton (PS)	Church Gresley
15:00		Report	Ansu 21'	Stadium: Moat Ground; Attendance: 381; Referee: Aidan Murphy
Note: Gresley Rovers were reinstated into the competition, as both Kimberley Miners Welfare and Clay Cross Town were removed for fielding ineligible players.

Final

9 May 2026	Nuneaton Town (PS)	1–2	Moulton (PS)	Stamford
15:00	Jardine 7'	Report	Stevens 48'; Isom 86'	Stadium: Zeeco Stadium; Attendance: 381; Referee: Richard Graves
Note: Nuneaton Town were reinstated into the competition, after Coalville Town were deemed to have fielded an ineligible player in their semi-final.
