= 1889–90 Midland Football League =

Midland Football League
- Season: 1889–90
- Champions: Lincoln City
- Matches: 105
- Goals: 419 (3.99 per match)

The 1889–90 Midland Football League season was the first in the history of the Midland Football League, a football competition in England.

Lincoln City finished the season as the league's inaugural champions.

== League table ==
Pos	Team	Pld	W	D	L	GF	GA	GR	Pts
1	Lincoln City (C)	20	16	2	2	75	19	3.947	34
2	Derby Midland	19	11	3	5	41	30	1.367	25
3	Rotherham Town	20	11	3	6	44	27	1.630	25
4	Burton Wanderers	20	11	3	6	42	40	1.050	25
5	Staveley	20	9	4	7	46	28	1.643	22
6	Warwick County	20	9	4	7	36	28	1.286	22
7	Gainsborough Trinity	19	8	5	6	47	32	1.469	21
8	Derby Junction	18	7	2	9	32	49	0.653	16
9	Leek	20	3	2	15	26	64	0.406	8
10	Notts Rangers	15	1	4	10	11	36	0.306	6
11	Sheffield	19	2	2	15	19	66	0.288	6

Source: RSSSF
Rules for classification: The points system until the 1990–91 season: 2 points for a win, 1 point for a draw and 0 points for losing.
(C) Champions
