= Brimington F.C. =

Brimington F.C. was an English football club based in Brimington.

== History ==
The team participated in the Midland Football League, winning the First Division title in 1976 before resigning a year later.
