= Blidworth Welfare F.C. =

Association football club in England

Coordinates: 53°06′15.68″N 1°07′07.08″W

Blidworth Welfare
- Full name: Blidworth Welfare Football Club
- Founded: 1926
- Ground: Welfare Ground, NG21 0LR
- Chairman: Chris Wain Leading goalscorer - Reilly Hodgkinson
- Manager: Callum Harris
- League: Central Midlands Alliance Premier Division South
- 2025–26: Central Midlands Alliance Premier Division South, 14th of 17
Home colours	Away colours

Blidworth Welfare Football Club is a football club based in Blidworth, near Mansfield, Nottinghamshire, England. They are currently members of the Central Midlands Alliance Premier Division South.

== History ==
Folk House Old Boys changed its name to Blidworth Welfare FC in 1982. From 2008, the club played in the Central Midlands League until 2022, when they were promoted to the United Counties League. They first entered the FA Cup in the 1993–94 season.

=== 1980s ===
The 1982–83 season was important for the club as they changed their name to Blidworth Welfare FC and became founding members of the newly formed Northern Countries East League (NCEL), a competition founded from the merging of the Midland Football League and the Yorkshire Football League. Blidworth joined the Division One South of the NCEL starting in the 1984–85 season and then twelve months later the club joined the NCEL Division Three following further reorganization of the leagues. The 1986–87 season saw the club leave the NCEL to join the Central Midlands Alliance League, starting in their Premier Division.

=== 1990s ===
In 1990, Blidworth was promoted to the Supreme Division of the Central Midlands Alliance League.

In 1994, Blidworth were promoted back to the Northern Counties East League for the following 1994–95 season, where they competed in Division One. However, this was short-lived as the club were relegated back to the Central Midlands Supreme Division at the end of the 1997–98 season, as they finished bottom. They lost all 28 league games, conceding 186 goals and scoring only eight in that season, a campaign so bad that the FA invited them to a training session with the England national football team. The club were invited to the FA's Lilleshall Centre of Excellence for a tour of the facilities and then the afternoon of training from England's coaches.

John Slater was in charge for the 1998–99 season as the club were relegated to the Central Midlands Premier Division. At the last minute, the club was rescued thanks to the efforts of Steve Spencer, who after initially spending time maintaining the ground, decided to take over as the new first team manager. His efforts kept the club alive but despite the club boasting facilities capable of being used at a much higher level, the club struggled to attract the players to match it.

=== 2000s ===
The club had the facilities to play at a much higher level but were struggling to build a team capable of achieving the success it craved. In 2001, Rudy Funk, a local manager, was appointed as the new first team manager by incoming chairman Alan Whitworth and the pair started to turn the club around on and off the pitch.

Two seasons of relative success and rebuilding followed, but after Funk's departure in 2003, Blidworth struggled in the league and cup competitions for a number of years under different management teams. In April 2007 and under the management of Dave Hughes, the club won the Nottingham shire Intermediate Cup beating Bulwell FC 2–0 at Hucknall Town's Watnall Road Ground. In 2007 the Central Midlands league was reshuffled and saw Blidworth move to the Supreme Division and again the club reached the final of the Quartet Catering League Cup where they lost 1–0 in extra time to Dunkirk, this defeat had followed an extraordinary cup run where Blidworth beat holders of the cup Heanor Town, league leaders and champions elect Askern Welfare, plus Holbrook Miners Welfare in the semi-final.

After 2 seasons at the helm Dave Hughes resigned as manager of the first team before the start of the 2008–09 season due to his brother being attacked whilst on holiday in Crete. Hughes felt he could not continue whilst his brother was in a serious medical condition in hospital. This resulted in chairman Alan Whitworth appointing the management duo of Kevin Chappell and Keith Easom assisted by ex-Blidworth player Simon Ward. The pair had previously worked together at Shirebrook Town looking after the Reserve and A sides. Easom had been a player at Shirebrook Town whilst Chappell had experienced football management at Worksop Town, Matlock Town, Matlock United and had been assistant to Rudy Funk during his days in charge at Blidworth. The club appointed Graeme Rodger and Chris Bullock to manage the reserve side that played in the Supreme Reserves Division of the Central Midlands League.

The first team had to manage without Kev Chappell during the second part of the season as ill health forced him to leave his role at the club. Easom ran the first team largely on his own until the end of the season and managed to keep Blidworth in the Supreme Division finishing in 14th position with the reserves finishing in 10th. The start of the 2009–10 season saw Keith Easom promote Chris Bullock to join him as assistant manager with Graeme Rodger left to run the reserves alone. Stan Matthews, a qualified Level 2 coach, was appointed as the under 19's manager assisted by Bullock. The season also saw the removal of the old wooden tea bar at the ground that had been in place since the club began. The management team then purchased a redundant portable cabin which they developed into a more usable hospitality area.

=== 2010s ===
In January 2010, the clubs old wooden changing rooms, which had not been used for a number of months for health and safety reasons, were demolished and the football club moved into the cricket pavilion until their own facilities were rebuilt. Plans and funding applications were well underway for a brand new football changing facility overseen by vice chairlady Helen Wilford which were hoped to be in place for the season after. Blidworth finished in 17th place at the end of season. Keith Easom, Chris Bullock and Stan Matthews resigned from their positions at the club and it was then decided not to run an under 19 side for season 2010–11. Graeme Rodger had resigned from running the reserves in February 2010. Players Dave Voller and Jez Wright, supported by former referee Darren Wragg, stepped up to run the reserve side for the remainder of the season but they finished bottom of the Supreme Reserve Division.

Former Southwell City and Kirkby Town Manager Brett Marshall was appointed Blidworth First Team Manager for season 2010–11 assisted by Steve Roebuck. Marshall had a successful playing career at clubs such as Retford United and can count Blidworth as one of his old teams. With the knowledge and reputation to attract players, Blidworth was hoping Marshall's appointment would see them challenging for promotion at the end of the season. Former player Liam Best assisted by Darren Wragg were appointed by Marshall to run the reserve team. Best left the club after a few months due to work commitments and reserve captain Dave Voller stepped up to help Wragg to the end of the season seeing the reserves finishing 4th in the league. Marshall led the first team into the runners up spot but only after a defeat by eventual champions Sheffield Parramore.

In July 2011, after Marshall's departure to Retford United and also the sudden departure of chairman Alan Whitworth after 12 years at the club saw Scott Ward and Dave Voller taking over the running of the club and first team. Working alongside Mick Gould as assistant manager the trio worked hard to rebuild the club from scratch. They brought in a whole new squad and backroom staff, including Chris Wain as grounds man but the team finished the season in 12th place in the CML South division after the league split to reduce travelling. The reserve team was scrapped for the season due to lack of funds but the club saw the return of an under 19 squad led by Martin Bower. Bower assisted by Kevin Heathcote brought a squad of players to the club and finished the season in 6th place along with a late quarter final defeat in the under 19's shield.

On 7 October 2012, the changing facilities at Welfare Ground opened for use after local resident Don French took over the stalling project from Helen Wilford in September 2011 and within 10 months dug the first spade on site, after nearly 3 seasons sharing the cricket pavilion. Gary Shelton joined the club as the new chairman with Dave Voller, Mick Gould and Mike Wain left to run the first team. Voller and Gould stepped down from their roles as the season began so Mike Wain brought in Richard Preston and Lee Cook to attempt to stabilise the club. Wain and Preston left the club in November after a sub-par start to the season leaving Cook along with Gareth Briggs and Scott McMillan the task of reviving the club's fortunes. Unfortunately the club could not gain enough points to lift the club off the bottom of the table. Martin Bower and Kevin Heathcote ran the reinstated reserve team after impressing at under 19 level and finished the season in 3rd position.

Season 2013/14 saw Martin Bower and Kevin Heathcote promoted to run the first team after Cook, Briggs and McMillan left the club at the end of the season for Pinxton F.C. The pair introduced local youth to the team but struggled to compete in a competitive league finishing 3rd from bottom. Scott Ward left the club in November 2013 for a role at Heanor Town F.C. but Paul Holmes, Andy North and Andy Ellis joined the club to run an under 19 squad and the reserve team, both sides produced some great results with a youth team squad fresh from winning the Mansfield Chad Under 16 league the year before. The under 19 squad finished 2nd behind Mansfield Town and 5th place in the reserve premier division using under 18 players.

The season after saw big changes at the club, Bower and Heathcote moved to Pinxton F.C. and Holmes quit football. The Rainworth M W reserve team manager Ady Smith bought his championship winning reserve squad to the Welfare Ground for the new season. Smith bought with him Ian Cotton from Sherwood Colliery to run the reserve team The season went well with first team finishing in an improved 7th place in the league after Smith left for Shirebrook Town midway through the season with players Rob Camm and Danny Bacon taking over. Cotton's reserve team won the Reserve Premier Division title and the Reserve League Cup but lost in extra time to Thoresby C W reserves in the President's Cup final after extra time. Thoresby was later found to have played ineligible players in the game so the cup was handed to Blidworth by the league committee. Chairman Gary Shelton left the club on the last day of the season to pursue other interests.

The season 2015/16 saw Ian Cotton's treble winning reserve squad challenge for honours in the CML South Division, Cotton brought in Ian Birtley to assist him and Jason Lilliman to run the reserve side, Rachael Swinney also joined the club as secretary replacing Pete Dean. Cotton's squad finished 6th in the league and missed out on victory in the league cup with a late 2–1 defeat to Hucknall Rolls Leisure in the final. Cotton's squad beat higher league opposition twice before being made to replay St Andrews on a technicality and losing in extra time. The reserve team struggled in the league finishing in 11th place before disbanding at the end of the season.

Season 2016/17 started where Blidworth left off the season before, with Ian Cotton and Ian Birtley in charge of the first team. Scott Ward returned to the club as secretary and Dave Voller rejoined as chairman to guide the club forward. The campaign started slowly but began to gain momentum with key players returning from injury and suspension along with the return of ex-manager Michael Wain as coach. Again Blidworth fared well in the FA Vase beating higher league opponents Teversal, Shirebrook Town and Heanor Town before losing to a late goal from AFC Mansfield in the second round of the competition in front of 146 spectators at the Welfare Ground. Cotton, Wain and Birtley all left the club in February 2017 to save Cotton's home town club Clipstone from folding so goalkeeper Steve Smith stepped up and took over the manager's role guiding the club to a 12 place finish.

In the summer of 2017 Scott Ward and Chris Wain again started to rebuild the club. With stability a big factor in their decision the pair appointed Lewis Saxby as first team manager after Steve Smith had stepped down from temporary charge after the last game of the season at Southwell City. Saxby brought in Dan Machin and Dan Hatfield as his assistants along with Keiran Booker as Media Manager to help promote the club. Saxby brought in a new squad of players to start the 2017/18 season in the CML South but promised to use the club's youth system to garner local talent in men's football. Blidworth Welfare Junior chairman asked Adam Gullett to join his coaching staff. Saxby used the season to build a competitive squad and finished 7th place in South division.

Season 2018/19 saw Lewis Saxby, Dan Machin and Adam Gullett attempt to build on their start to life at Blidworth by resigning most of the squad that ended the previous campaign. The introduction of a new midweek Under 21 team at the Welfare Ground managed by Lee Richardson and his coach Adam Gullett gave the manager an avenue to garner young local talent in men's football and support his squad on Saturdays. Saxby left Blidworth in October after nine straight wins. After being tempted by Rainworth MW to try his luck at step 6, most of the squad left with the manager. Chairman Chris Wain appointed Scott Rogers as the new first team manager assisted by Danny Staley and Richard Hannigan who brought in a team to fight the cause until the end of the season, finishing 7th place in CMFL South division.

Season 2019/20 saw local manager Scott Rogers again in charge at the Welfare Ground for what would be his first full season at the club, Richard Hannigan again assisted Rogers but Danny Staley left the club to return to Kimberley MW. Local UEFA Badged coach Dean Mitchell replaced Staley and all three attempted to produce a team that could be competitive in the CMFL. The season was going well until Rogers received a 4-month ban from the game in November and resigned as manager. Richard Hannigan became manager and with Mitchell, guided the club into the top 6 before the season ended prematurely in March with 10 games to play due to COVID-19.

=== 2020s ===
Season 20/21 started in September due to COVID-19 with Richard Hannigan continuing as First Team Manager and Dean Mitchell as First Team Coach. Hannigan brought Steve Smith back to the club as his assistant from Rainworth MW and the 3 embarked on adding to an already good squad to compete in a strong CMFL South division. A stop-start season was finally abolished in April 2021 after 4 months of inactivity due to the global pandemic with Blidworth unbeaten and top of the table. The CMFL however did arrange an end of season champions league style tournament for clubs to play out the final months.

Season 21/22 after phase-2 of drainage work was completed on the pitch by chairman Chris Wain, saw Hannigan, Smith and Mitchell pick up where they left off after re-signing all but one of the previous season's unbeaten squad. The club also restarted a reserve team to support the manager in the development of the club's young players led by Nigel Dobney. The first team won the CMFL South Division title finishing four points clear of Mickleover FC gaining promotion to Step 6 of the football pyramid, the first time Blidworth had won a trophy in over 15 years. The reserve side finished sixth in the table in their first ever season in men's football using mostly under-19 players.

Season 22/23 after a good start to the season, manager Richard Hannigan had to vacate his role as first team manager. Scott Ward ended in bringing in a well respected Manager in local football 'Cookie'. Cookie then said some oblique comments about the previous manager, Richard Hannigan. This resulted in all the players ending up leaving and therefore the club resigned from the league. Many players stayed playing for the reserves which was run by previous goal keeping coach, Steve Smith. Daren Fowler help keep the club alive.

Season 23/24 Blidworth had their best ever season in the CMA Div 1 with 20 Games 19 wins 1 draw 0 losses in the league. Gaining promotion back to the CMA Premier League, but this time to the Northern Prem. Under the stewardship of Aiden Harris.

== Staff ==
- Chairman – Darren Dyson
- Vice chairman – Darren Dyson
- Club Secretary – Daren Fowler
- Club Treasurer – Daren Fowler
- Committee – Lorraine Lawson
- Committee – Chris Wain
- Gate Man – Darren Dyson
- Manager – Callum Harris
- Groundsman - Chris Wain

== Timeline ==
- 1926 Club formed as Folk House Old Boys
- 1981–82 Changed name to Blidworth Welfare
- 1982–83 Founder members of Northern Counties East League
- 1984–85 Joined Division One South on re-organisation
- 1985–86 Joined Division Three on re-organisation. (Failed to complete fixtures – record expunged)
- 1986–97 Joined Central Midlands League Premier Division
- 1990–91 Elevated to Supreme Division
- 1994–95 Rejoined Northern Counties East League in Division One
- 1998–99 Rejoined Central Midlands League Supreme Division
- 1998–99 Demoted to Premier Division
- 2006–07 Won Nottinghamshire Intermediate Cup
- 2011–12 Joined Central Midlands League South Division on re-organisation
- 2021–22 Central Midlands League South Division Champions
- 2022–23 Promoted to United Counties Division One
- 2023–24 Resigned mid-season from United Counties Division One

== Records ==
- FA Cup
  - First qualifying round 1996–97
- FA Vase
  - Second round 2016–17
  - Second round 2018–19
