= Carrvale United F.C. =

Carrvale United
- Full name: Carrvale United Football Club

Carrvale United F.C. was an English football club.

== History ==
The club was a member of the Midland League during the late 1970s, finishing 4th in 1978, and also competed in the FA Vase on two occasions.
