= Attenborough F.C. =

Association football club in England

Attenborough
- Full name: Attenborough Football Club
- Nickname: Boro
- Founded: 1947
- Ground: The Strand
- Capacity: 1,000
- Manager: Graham Mee
- League: Nottinghamshire Senior League Division Three
- 2024–25: Nottinghamshire Senior League Development Division 2nd of 9
- Website: https://www.clubwebsite.co.uk/attenboroughfc01/135751/Home
Home colours	Away colours

Attenborough Football club is a football club based in Attenborough, Nottinghamshire, England. Affiliated with the Nottinghamshire County Football Association, they are currently members of the Nottinghamshire Senior League Division Three.

== History ==
The club was formed in 1947 and were originally called Attenborough St Marys. The club played in the Long Eaton League. In 1973 the club joined Division One of the Central Alliance, gaining promotion to the Premier division at the first attempt. Two seasons later in the 1975–76 season the club would win the Premier division.

The club joined division one of the Midland League for the 1976–77 season, and staying there until the end of the 1981–82 season. The 1983–84 season saw the club become one of the founding members of the Central Midlands League. After nine seasons the club joined Division Two of the Nottinghamshire Senior League. The 1995–96 season saw the club finish as runners-up in Division Two gaining promotion to Division One, the following season saw another promotion to the Senior Division where they have remained until withdrawing in 2023.

The club re-formed in 2023 in the Development division of the Notts Senior League and finished 3rd in the league for the 2023/24 season. The club remained in the Development division for 2024/25, again finishing 3rd. The club won the Development league cup with a 3-2 win against FC Warriors of Newark in season 2024/25.

== Ground ==
The club play their home games at The Strand.

== Honours ==
- Central Alliance
  - Premier Division Champions (1) 1975–76
- Notts Intermediate Cup
  - Winners (1) 2017–18
- Notts Senior League
  - Development Cup Winners 2024-25
