= Creswell Colliery F.C. =

Creswell Colliery FC
- Founded: 1948
- Dissolved: 1986
- Ground: The Hutts
Home colours

Creswell Colliery F.C. was an English association football club which participated in the Midland Football League and the FA Cup. During the 1954/55 season, Creswell Colliery FC successfully reached the 1st round proper of the FA Cup and were drawn to play Football League opposition Accrington Stanley from the Third Division North. After switching the match to Peel Park, a strong following including the colliery brass band travelled to Accrington on 20 November 1954 where, despite scoring, Creswell lost 7–1.

== History ==
| Season | Division | Position | FA Cup |
|---|---|---|---|
| 1948–49 | Chesterfield Senior League – | | 1st Qualifying Round |
| 1949–50 | Central Alliance League – Division 1 | 12th/18 | 1st Qualifying Round |
| 1950–51 | Central Alliance League – Division 1 | 6th/20 | 2nd Qualifying Round |
| 1951–52 | Central Alliance League – Division 1 | 4th/20 | 4th Qualifying Round |
| 1952–53 | Central Alliance League – Division 1 | 2nd/20 | 3rd Qualifying Round |
| 1953–54 | Central Alliance League – Division 1 | 5th/19 | 3rd Qualifying Round |
| 1954–55 | Central Alliance League – Division 1 | 3rd/19 | 1st Round Proper |
| 1955–56 | Central Alliance League – Division 1 | 7th/21 | 1st Qualifying Round |
| 1956–57 | Central Alliance League – Division 1 North | 10th/16 | 2nd Qualifying Round |
| 1957–58 | Central Alliance League – Division 1 North | 13th/17 | 3rd Qualifying Round |
| 1958–59 | Central Alliance League – Division 1 North | 6th/18 | 1st Qualifying Round |
| 1959–60 | Central Alliance League – Division 1 North | 10th/18 | 2nd Qualifying Round |
| 1960–61 | Central Alliance League – Division 1 North | 13th/18 | Preliminary Round |
| 1961–62 | Central Alliance League – Premier Division | 11th/17 | 1st Qualifying Round |
| 1962–63 | Central Alliance League – Premier Division | 5th/15 | 1st Qualifying Round |
| 1963–64 | Central Alliance League – Premier Division | 6th/22 | 1st Qualifying Round |
| 1964–65 | Central Alliance League – Division 1 | 1st/16 | 1st Qualifying Round |
| 1965–66 | Central Alliance League – Premier Division | 5th/21 | - |
| 1966–67 | Central Alliance League – Premier Division | 6th/20 | - |
| 1967–68 | East Midlands Regional League – Premier Division | 5th/20 | - |
| 1968–69 | East Midlands Regional League – Premier Division | 10th/20 | - |
| 1969–70 | East Midlands Regional League – Premier Division | withdrew | - |
| 1970–71 | Mansfield League – Division 1 | | - |
| 1971–72 | Mansfield League – Division 1 | | - |
| 1972–73 | Sutton & Skegby League – Section 'A' | | - |
| 1973–74 | Sutton & Skegby League – Premier Division | | - |
| 1974–75 | Sutton & Skegby League – Premier Division | | - |
| 1975–76 | Sutton & Skegby League – Premier Division | | - |
| 1976–77 | Sutton & Skegby League – Premier Division | | - |
| 1977–78 | Sutton & Skegby League – Premier Division | 1st | - |
| 1978–79 | Midland Counties League – Division 1 | 4th/16 | - |
| 1979–80 | Midland Counties League – Division 1 | 7th/16 | - |
| 1980–81 | Midland Counties League – Division 1 | 9th/16 | - |
| 1981–82 | Midland Counties League – Division 1 | 8th/16 | - |
| 1982–83 | Northern Counties East League – Division 2 South | 11th/14 | - |
| 1983–84 | Mansfield League – Division 2 | | - |
| 1984–85 | Mansfield League – Division 1 | | - |
| 1985–86 | Sutton & Skegby League – Section 'A' | | - |

== Honours ==
- Central Alliance
  - Division One champions 1964–65
- Sutton & Skegby League
  - Premier Division champions 1977–78
- Midland Counties League
  - Division One League Cup winners 1981–82
- FA Cup
  - First Round proper 1954–55
