= Clifton All Whites F.C. =

Association football club in England

Coordinates: 52°54′0.8″N 1°10′0.2″W

Clifton All Whites
- Full name: Clifton All Whites Football Club
- Nicknames: CFC, All Whites, Whites
- Founded: 1963
- Ground: Norman Archer Memorial, Clifton
- Owner: Young Boys Clubs
- Chairman: Richard Hipkiss
- Manager: Tom Curson
- League: United Counties League Division One
- 2025–26: United Counties League Division One, 9th of 23
- Website: http://www.cliftonfc.co.uk
Home colours

Clifton All Whites Football Club is a football club based in Clifton, Nottingham. Formed in 1963 as a youth team, the club expanded to include a senior team in the 1970s. The first team are currently members of the United Counties League Division One.

== History ==
Clifton All Whites was founded in 1963, originally under the name of Thistledown Rovers. The club's founder members included Dick Lambert and Bill Norwell. During the 1960s and 1970s Clifton All Whites dominated youth football in Nottinghamshire by attracting the best players from all over the county, now most players are local. In 1963 there were only four teams in the Young Elizabethan League, and as the club developed, more teams and clubs were founded, many with advice and help from Clifton All Whites. By 1966 plans were underway for Clifton All Whites to test their skills abroad in a tournament in the Netherlands, at a time when overseas tours were rare. In the early days when football clubs only usually supplied shirts for their players a new standard was set as Clifton All Whites supplied a full strip. Another first was when the under 12's played a top Scottish team before a crowd of over 20,000 before a First Division match between Nottingham Forest and Newcastle United.

Professional clubs attempted to persuade Clifton All Whites to become a nursery club, but still the club policy is not to become tied to any one club. David Staniforth was the first player to make a career as a professional footballer, with Sheffield United.

Clifton All Whites performed well in FA Youth Cup games and eventually gained their own ground. In 1973 the club ventured out of youth football to senior football and joined the Midland League. Mick Walker was the first club manager and coach. He later served as manager of Notts County. The club resigned from the Midland League partway the 1977–78 season. During the 1990s the club played in the Nottinghamshire Alliance and later joined the Nottinghamshire Senior League. In 2010 Clifton joined the Central Midlands League South Division and continued to play in that division until 2015. In 2013–14 Clifton won the South Division championship.

Clifton All Whites are still thriving with teams from Junior Soccer School and Under 7's to seniors and in 1999 the club introduced the first girls' team.

== Honours ==
=== Senior ===
Year	League	Team	Honours
2005/06	League Cup Senior Section	Clifton FC	Winners
2006/07	Notts Senior League Division 1	Clifton Reserves	League Champions
2009/10	Notts Senior League	Clifton FC	League Champions
2011/12	Central Midlands League Cup	Clifton FC	Runners Up
2012/13	Central Midlands League Cup	Clifton FC	Winners
2013/14	Central Midlands League	Clifton FC	Winners
2016/17	Notts Senior League	Clifton FC	League Champions

=== Youth (11 a side) ===
Year	League	Honours
1964	Young Elizabethan League U12	League Champions, Cup Finalists
1964	Notts Church League U14	League Champions and Cup Finalists
1965	Young Elizabethan League U12	League Champions, Cup Finalists
1965	Notts Church League U14	League Champions and Cup Finalists
1966	Young Elizabethan League U12	Cup Winners
1966	Young Elizabethan League U14	League Champions and Cup Winners
1967	Young Elizabethan League U12	League Champions and Cup Winners
1967	Young Elizabethan League U14	League Champions and Cup Winners
1967	Young Elizabethan League U16	League Champions and Cup Winners
1967	Notts Church League U14	League Champions and Cup Winners
1967	Notts Youth League U14	League Champions and Cup Winners
1967	Notts Youth League U16	League Champions and Cup Winners
1968	Young Elizabethan League U12	League Champions and Cup Winners
1968	Young Elizabethan League U14	League Champions and Cup Winners
1968	Young Elizabethan League U16	League Champions and Cup Winners
1968	Notts Youth League U16	League Champions, Cup Winners and County Winners
1968	Notts Youth League U18	League Runners Up

== Records ==
- FA Trophy best performance:
  - First Qualifying Round, 1972–73
- FA Vase best performance:
  - Third Round, 1975–76

== Personnel ==
=== Team management ===
Position	Staff
Manager	(England) Tom Curson
Assistant Manager	(Scotland) Steve Hardie
Fitness coach	To Follow
Goalkeeping coach	To Follow
Physio	To Follow
1st Team Sec	(England) Dave Wigley
Reserves manager	Roy Sharpe, Barry Turner

Last updated: 6 Jan 2012
Source: Clifton FC

== Club officials ==
Role	Nat	Name
President	(Scotland)	Steve Hardie
Chairman	(England)	Richard Hipkiss
Vice Chairman	(England)	Dave Wigley
Treasurer	(England)	Lee Maakings
Club Manager	(England)	Vacant
Secretary	(England)	Tony Bowles
Welfare Officer	(England)	Cassie Cragg
Groundsman	(England)	John Taylor
Committee	(England)	James Turner

Office	Name
Committee	Vacant

Last updated: 1 July 2012
Source: Clifton FC
