= Boston Town F.C. =

Association football club in England

Coordinates: 52°59′29.96″N 0°02′17.14″W

Boston Town
- Full name: Boston Town Football Club
- Nickname: The Poachers
- Founded: 1964
- Ground: Tattershall Road, Boston
- Capacity: 6,000 (450 seated)
- Chairman: Mick Vines
- Manager: Chris Funnell
- League: Northern Premier League Division One Midlands
- 2025–26: United Counties League Premier Division North, 1st of 20 (promoted)
- Website: bostontownfc.co.uk
Home colours	Away colours

Boston Town Football Club is a football club based in Boston, Lincolnshire, England. They are currently a members of the Northern Premier League Division One Midlands and play at Tattershall Road.

== History ==
The club was established as Boston Football Club in 1964 by former officials of Boston United who were concerned that United's financial problems which had led them to resign from the Midland League would force the club to fold. The new club joined the Lincolnshire League, winning the league in their first season. They moved to the Central Alliance the following season, going on to win a second successive league title without losing a match. In 1966 they joined the Eastern Counties League. After finishing sixth in their first season, the club finished second from bottom in 1967–68, forcing them to seek re-election. However, as the club was on the northern edge of the league's geographical boundary, they resigned and moved to the Midland League.

Boston won the Midland League in 1974–75; after completing their league fixtures, they were ahead of Eastwood Town in the table but Eastwood had one match left at Skegness and could overtake Boston if they won. Despite being 3–1 up at half time, Eastwood eventually drew 3–3, meaning Boston were champions. In 1976–77 the club reached the first round of the FA Cup for the first time, losing 3–1 at Barnsley. They won the Midland League again in 1978–79; in a repeat of the 1974–75 title, Boston finished their fixtures and were top of the table, but Skegness could overtake them if they won their final fixture at Retford Town. However, Skegness lost, resulting in Boston were champions.

Boston won their third Midland League title in 1980–81, and in 1982 became members of the Northern Counties East Football League when the Midland League merged with the Yorkshire League. The club were placed in the Premier Division of the new league, but after finishing bottom in 1986–87, dropped into the Supreme Division of the Central Midlands League. They won the Central Midlands League in 1988–89, and despite only finishing ninth in 1990–91, were accepted into the Premier Division of the United Counties League. In 1993–94 the club reached the semi-finals of the FA Vase, but lost 2–0 on aggregate to Taunton Town. In 1994 Boston were renamed Boston Town and won the United Counties League in their first season under the new name. They won the league for a second time in 2000–01 and went on to win the League Cup in 2003–04 and again in 2006–07. In 2008–09 Boston won the Lincolnshire Senior Trophy, beating Winterton Rangers in the final. When the Premier Division was split in 2021, the club were placed in the Premier Division North.

Boston won the Lincolnshire Senior Trophy again in 2022–23, defeating Deeping Rangers 2–0 in the final. In 2024–25 they finished fourth in the Premier Division North, qualifying for the promotion play-offs. After beating Eastwood 2–1 in the semi-finals, they lost the final against Bourne Town 8–7 on penalties. The following season saw the club promoted as champions.

== Ground ==
The club initially played at the Mayflower Sports Ground for a few months, before moving to their current Tattershall Road ground. The ground has a wooden stand on one side of the pitch, which is divided into three sections, one of which has seats. Another stand with bench seating is located behind one goal, with a covered area behind the other goal adjacent to the clubhouse, turnstiles and tea bar. The ground currently has a capacity of 6,000, of which 450 is seated and 950 covered.

== Honours ==
- United Counties League
  - Premier Division champions 1994–95, 2000–01
  - Premier Division North champions 2025–26
  - League Cup winners 2003–04, 2006–07
- Central Midlands League
  - Supreme Division champions 1988–89
- Midland League
  - Champions 1974–75, 1978–79, 1980–81
  - League Cup winners 1976–77
- Central Alliance
  - Champions 1965–66
- Lincolnshire League
  - Champions 1964–65
- Lincolnshire Senior Trophy
  - Winners 1973–74, 1979–80, 1980–81, 1981–82, 1988–89, 1989–90, 2008–09, 2022–23
- Lincolnshire Senior B Cup
  - Winners 1965–66

== Records ==
- Best FA Cup performance: First round, 1976–77
- Best FA Trophy performance: Second round, 1979–80
- Best FA Vase performance: Semi-finals, 1993–94
- Record attendance: 2,700 vs Boston United, FA Cup third qualifying round, 1970
- Biggest victory: 12–1 vs Clay Cross Works, 1965–66
- Most appearances: Lee Rippin
- Most goals: Gary Bull, 201, 2005–12
- Most goals in a season: Gary Bull, 57, 2006–07

== See also ==
- Boston Town F.C. players
- Boston Town F.C. managers
