= Linby Colliery F.C. =

Association football club in England

Linby Colliery
- Full name: Linby Colliery Football Club
- Founded: 1892
- Ground: AJS Embroidery Arena, Church Lane
- Capacity: 1,500
- Chairman: Ade Ward
- Manager: Jonathan Wass
- League: Central Midlands Alliance Premier Division South
- 2024–25: Central Midlands Alliance Premier Division South, 3rd of 18
Home colours	Away colours

Linby Colliery Football Club is a football club from Linby in Nottinghamshire, England.

They were formed in 1892 and were known as Linby Colliery Welfare for a period during the 1990s and 2000s. In 2012–13 they started playing in the Central Midlands League South Division.

Their most significant achievement was reaching the 1st round proper of the FA Cup in 1950–51. In a cup run lasting seven rounds they won 4–0 at Boston United before playing Gillingham in the first round proper. They lost to Gillingham 1–4 at home on 25 November 1950, with Linby's goal scored by Ralph 'Dickie' Dulson, father of future Port Vale star Garry Dulson.

In 1975–76 the club became founder members of the Midland County League Division One. In 2021-22 Linby won the Central Midlands League Cup, beating Mickleover RBL on penalties, after a 1-1 draw, at Alfreton Town F.C.

In the 2024-25 season, Linby finished third in the league and won the Notts FA Senior Trophy, beating Blidworth Welfare 3-0 in the final.

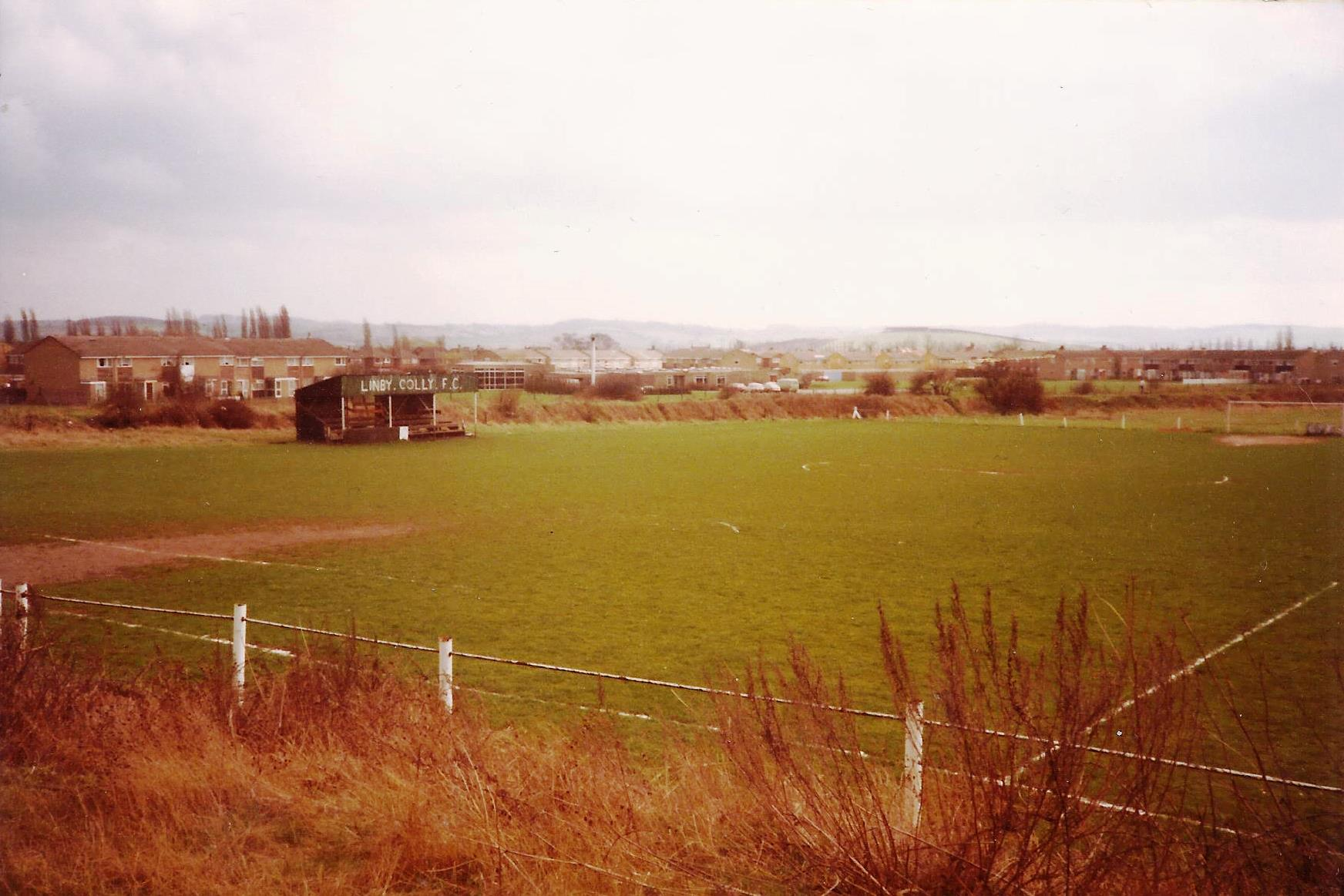
Linby Colliery FC Original Ground 1980s
