= Mexborough Town F.C. =

Mexborough Town
- Full name: Mexborough Town Football Club
- Founded: 1962
- Dissolved: 1993
- Ground: Hampden Road
- Capacity: 5,000

Mexborough Town Football Club was an English association football club based in Mexborough, Doncaster, South Yorkshire.

== History ==
Founded in 1962, the club was the third senior club to originate from the town, following in the footsteps of Mexborough and Mexborough Athletic.

They joined the Yorkshire League in their inaugural season, with a runners-up finish securing promotion from Division Two to the league's top flight. They finished runners-up in Division One at the first time of asking, and would enter the FA Cup for the first time the following year. They would again finish as league runners-up in 1969 before finally securing their first Yorkshire League title in 1973. It was around this time that they changed their name to Mexborough Town Athletic, and in 1974 they took the decision to enter teams into both the Yorkshire League and the Midland League. This arrangement would only last a year, as the club decided to stay solely in the Midland League.

In 1982 the Yorkshire League and Midland League merged to form the Northern Counties East League (NCEL), and Mexborough were among the founder members of the new competition, being entered into the Premier Division. They were relegated to Division One in 1985 before changing their name back to Mexborough Town.

After finishing bottom of the NCEL Division One in 1991, they resigned from the NCEL to join the Central Midlands League, but they would last just two years in this competition before resigning and disbanding.

=== League and cup history ===
Mexborough Town League and Cup history
Season	Division	Position	FA Cup	FA Trophy	FA Vase
1962–63	Yorkshire League Division 2	2nd/15	-	-	-
1963–64	Yorkshire League Division 1	2nd/16	-	-	-
1964–65	Yorkshire League Division 1	9th/16	1st qualifying round	-	-
1965–66	Yorkshire League Division 1	9th/16	1st qualifying round	-	-
1966–67	Yorkshire League Division 1	8th/17	1st qualifying round	-	-
1967–68	Yorkshire League Division 1	13th/17	1st qualifying round	-	-
1968–69	Yorkshire League Division 1	2nd/18	Preliminary round	-	-
1969–70	Yorkshire League Division 1	3rd/18	1st qualifying round	1st qualifying round	-
1970–71	Yorkshire League Division 1	4th/14	1st qualifying round	2nd qualifying round	-
1971–72	Yorkshire League Division 1	4th/16	Preliminary round	1st qualifying round	-
1972–73	Yorkshire League Division 1	1st/16	1st qualifying round	3rd round	-
1973–74	Yorkshire League Division 1	4th/16	2nd qualifying round	1st round	-
1974–75	Yorkshire League Division 1 Midland League Premier Division	14th/16 6th/18	1st qualifying round	3rd qualifying round	-
1975–76	Midland League Premier Division	6th/18	4th qualifying round	1st round	-
1976–77	Midland League Premier Division	6th/18	3rd qualifying round	3rd qualifying round	-
1977–78	Midland League Premier Division	5th/17	1st qualifying round	3rd qualifying round	-
1978–79	Midland League Premier Division	3rd/19	1st qualifying round	1st qualifying round	-
1979–80	Midland League Premier Division	5th/18	2nd qualifying round	1st round	-
1980–81	Midland League Premier Division	13th/18	1st qualifying round	1st qualifying round	-
1981–82	Midland League Premier Division	8th/18	1st qualifying round	Preliminary round	-
1982–83	Northern Counties East League Premier Division	20th/20	1st qualifying round	1st qualifying round	-
1983–84	Northern Counties East League Premier Division	15th/18	-	1st qualifying round	-
1984–85	Northern Counties East League Premier Division	19th/19	-	1st qualifying round	-
1985–86	Northern Counties East League Division 1	13th/16	-	-	Preliminary round
1986–87	Northern Counties East League Division 1	16th/18	-	-	-
1987–88	Northern Counties East League Division 1	15th/16	-	-	-
1988–89	Northern Counties East League Division 1	11th/16	-	-	-
1989–90	Northern Counties East League Division 1	15th/15	-	-	-
1990–91	Northern Counties East League Division 1	13th/13	-	-	-
1991–92	Central Midlands League Premier Division North	4th/14	-	-	-
1992–93	Central Midlands League Premier Division	12th/19	-	-	-

== Honours ==
=== League ===
- Yorkshire League Division 1
  - Champions: 1972–73
  - Runners-up: 1963–64, 1968–69
- Yorkshire League Division 2
  - Promoted: 1962–63

=== Cup ===
- Sheffield & Hallamshire Senior Cup
  - Winners: 1963–64, 1974–75, 1976–77, 1982–83
  - Runners-up: 1963–64, 1977–78, 1978–79

== Records ==
- Best FA Cup performance: 4th qualifying round, 1975–76
- Best FA Trophy performance: 3rd round, 1972–73
- Best FA Vase performance: Preliminary round, 1985–86
