= Arnold Kingswell F.C. =

Association football club in Arnold, Nottinghamshire, England (1962–1989)

Arnold Kingswell
- Full name: Arnold Kingswell Football Club
- Founded: 1962
- Dissolved: 1989
- Ground: Nottingham Road

Arnold Kingswell F.C. was an English football club founded in 1962 based in Arnold, Nottinghamshire.

== History ==
The club were founded in 1962 as Arnold (Kingswell) Youth Club. They joined Division One of the East Midlands Regional League in 1970. A third-place finish in 1972–73 saw the club promoted to the Premier Division.

The club joined the Midland League in 1975. They were prominent members of the league's second tier First Division, but despite winning the league in 1980 and securing several runners-up finishes, they were never promoted to the Premier Division.

They first entered the FA Vase in 1976 but never progressed beyond the Third Round stage.

When the Midland League merged with the Yorkshire League to form the Northern Counties East League in 1982, Kingswell were placed in the new league's Division One South. In 1986 they moved down to the Central Midlands League, spending three years there before merging with Arnold to form Arnold Town in 1989.

== Records ==
- Best FA Vase performance: 3rd Round, 1976-1977
