= Ashby Institute F.C. =

Ashby Institute
- Full name: Ashby Institute Football Club
- Nickname(s): Institute
- Founded: 1917
- Dissolved: 1989
- Ground: The Screeds Ground
- 1988–89: Scunthorpe & District Football League

Ashby Institute F.C. was an English football club based in Ashby, Scunthorpe.

== History ==
The club was a member of the Midland League from 1968 to 1982, with a best finish of 3rd in 1974. The club turned down the opportunity to join the newly formed Northern Counties East League, instead returning to the Scunthorpe & District Football League. They were regular participants in the FA Cup, reaching the 3rd Qualifying Round in 1953.
