= Long Eaton Grange F.C. =

Long Eaton Grange
- Full name: Long Eaton Grange Football Club
- Nickname(s): Grange
- Founded: 1953
- Dissolved: 1985
Original colours

Long Eaton Grange F.C. was a football club based in Long Eaton, Derbyshire.

== History ==
It competed in the Midland League, Northern Counties East League and Central Midlands League.

The club was wound up in 1985, after 32 years' existence, due to a lack of finance. Its final game was a 3–0 home win over Alvaston & Boulton.

== Colours ==
The club originally played in white shirts, blue shorts, and blue socks. It later changed to all blue.

== Ground ==
The club played at Grange Park, shared with Long Eaton United.
