= Oakham United F.C. (Nottinghamshire) =

Oakham United
- Full name: Oakham United Football Club
- Nickname(s): The Acorns
- Founded: 1969
- Dissolved: 1996
- Ground: Mansfield Hosiery Mills, Sutton-in-Ashfield
- Capacity: 2000
Home colours

Oakham United F.C. was a football club based in Sutton-in-Ashfield, Nottinghamshire. It was formed in 1969 and was in existence up to 1996. There was often some confusion from visiting teams with the club named after an area of nearby Mansfield.

The club's most successful years came in the mid-1990s, finishing twice as runner-up in the Central Midlands Football League Supreme division, before becoming champions in the club's final year in the 1995–96 season. The club was unable to gain promotion from the league due to its Mansfield Hosiery Mills ground not meeting the criteria of the Northern Counties East League, one side of the ground over-lapping onto a cricket pitch. An ambitious plan to move to nearby Huthwaite and change the name to Sutton Town (at the time the old Sutton Town was known as Ashfield United) never materialised and the club resigned from the league.

The Hosiery Mills ground was planned to be developed as the new home of Mansfield Town, but they chose to stay at Field Mill. The ground was closed and the club house was later burnt down by vandals. The site is now a large B&Q store.

A totally separate club of the same name has been formed in Oakham, Rutland playing in the Peterborough & District League Premier Division
