= Arnold F.C. =

Arnold
- Full name: Arnold Football Club
- Nickname: The Saints
- Founded: 1928
- Dissolved: 1989
- Ground: Gedling Road

Arnold F.C. was an English football club based in Arnold, Nottinghamshire.

== History ==
The club were founded in 1928 as Arnold St. Mary's. The name "St. Mary's" was dropped in 1963, when Arnold joined the Midland League that year.

=== League ===
Arnold joined the Midland League in 1963. Throughout the late 1960s and early 1970s, they consistently finished in the upper reaches of the league, finishing runners-up in 1971 and 1976.

In 1982, When the Midland League merged with the Yorkshire League to form the Northern Counties East League (NCEL), Arnold was placed in the new league's Premier Division. In 1986, they won 24 games on their way to lifting the title. However, instead of advancing to the Northern Premier League, they moved down to the Central Midlands League (CML). They spent three years in the CML before merging with Arnold Kingswell to form Arnold Town in 1989.

=== Cup ===
Arnold first entered the FA Cup in 1964, and in 1967, they reached the First Round proper of the competition before losing 3–0 at home to Bristol Rovers in front of 3,390 fans. They repeated the feat in 1977, holding Port Vale to a draw at Gedling Road before being beaten 5–2 in a replay at Vale Park. The club also played in the FA Trophy and FA Vase.

== Records ==
- Best F.A Cup performance: 1st Round, 1967–1968, 1977-1978
- Best FA Trophy performance: 2nd Round, 1971-1972
- Best FA Vase performance: 2nd Round, 1987-1988

== Honours ==
- Northern Counties East League Premier Division
  - Champions 1985–86
  - Runners-Up 1983–84
- Central Midlands League Supreme Division
  - Cup Winners 1987–88
- Midland League
  - Cup Winners 1974–75
- Central Alliance
  - Champions 1962–63
- Nottinghamshire Senior Cup
  - Winners 1960–61, 1964–65, 1965–66, 1968–69, 1970–71
