= Kimberley Town F.C. =

Coordinates: 52°59′46.34″N 1°15′02.16″W

Kimberley Town
- Full name: Kimberley Town Football Club
- Nickname(s): The Stags
- Founded: 1886
- Dissolved: 2012
- Ground: The Stag Ground, Kimberley, Nottinghamshire
- Chairman: Graeme Critchley
- Manager: Paul Rawden
- 2011–12: Central Midlands League South Division, 16th (resigned)
Home colours	Away colours

Kimberley Town Football Club was a football club based in Kimberley, Nottinghamshire, England. They joined the Midland League in 1971. They reached the Second Round of the FA Vase three times. In the summer of 2012 the club resigned from the Central Midlands League South Division and folded. Their last manager was ex-pro Paul Rawden.

== History ==
There are records of teams named Kimberley and Kimberley St John's from the late 19th century, playing in the FA Cup between 1892 and 1908. However, the forerunner to the club, Kimberley YMCA, were first reported of in 1915 when they won the Notts Intermediate Cup. The club disbanded in 1928, but reformed with the purpose of playing friendlies in 1947. In the 1950s Kimberley YMCA joined the Notts Amateur League, winning the division's Senior Knockout Cup in 1954 before becoming league champions the following season. This led to promotion to Central Alliance League Division Two. A year later the club changed name to Kimberley Town. In 1986 the club were founder members of the Supreme Division, but a lack of floodlights meant demotion to the Premier Division four seasons later. In the period following, Kimberley Town spent many seasons in both the Premier and Supreme Divisions, with their best finish being second place in the Supreme Division in the 1997–98 season.

== Records ==
Central Midlands League Supreme Division

- 2nd – 1997–98

Central Midlands League Premier Division

- 5th – 2004–05

Notts Amateur League Division One

- Winners – 1954–55
- Runners-up – 1953–54

Notts Amateur League Senior Knockout Cup

- Winners – 1953–54

FA Cup

- Preliminary Round – 1995–96, 1996–97

FA Trophy

- 3rd Qualifying Round −1973–74

FA Vase

- 2nd Round – 1980–81, 1981–82, 1986–87
