= Staveley Works F.C. =

English football club

Staveley Works Football Club
- Dissolved: 1989
- Ground: Handley Wood Sports Ground

Staveley Works F.C. was an English football club based in Staveley, Derbyshire.

== History ==
The team participated in the Midland League, Northern Counties East League, Central Midlands Football League and the FA Vase.
