= Midland Football League (1889) =

- Founded: 1889
- Folded: 1982
- Country: England

The Midland Football League was a semi-professional football league in England. It acted as a feeder league to the Football League for many years before merging with the Yorkshire League in 1982 to form the Northern Counties East League.

== History ==
Founded in 1889, only one year after the Football League, the Midland League was the second league for professional clubs to be formed. Eleven clubs participated in the first season, 1889–90, four of whom (including the first champions, Lincoln City) would go on to achieve Football League status. The eleven founder members came from six counties.

In the early days of the Midland League, a number of the champion clubs were elected to the Football League, and in return, League clubs who failed to be re-elected were often accepted by the Midland League. Lincoln City and Doncaster Rovers both had a number of spells in both the Football League and Midland League.

With the larger professional clubs becoming stronger, they looked to place their reserve sides in the Midland League, Derby County being the first in 1894–95. Within less than a decade, more than half of the membership of the Midland League was made up of reserve teams.

Along with most other leagues, the Midland League closed down for the duration of World War I. When football resumed in 1919–20, the Midland League began to take on a different look. Three clubs (Chesterfield, Halifax Town and Lincoln City) joined the Football League when that organisation expanded to form a Third Division North, and the reserve sides of Football League clubs gradually left. More Midland League clubs progressed to the Football League, e.g. York City in 1929, and Mansfield Town in 1931.

Again, on the outbreak of World War II, the Midland League closed down, and resumed again in peacetime in 1945. After reaching a constitution of 24 clubs in 1946–47, the league entered a decade of stability. Peterborough United won the title for five consecutive seasons from 1955–56 to 1959–60. With most of the remaining Football League clubs reserve sides leaving in 1958, the league was reduced to a rump of just nine clubs, but was saved when the North Eastern League, a competition which had also suffered from the withdrawal of reserve sides, decided to disband, and the Midland League accepted into membership a number of north eastern sides, well to the north of its usual catchment area.

However, this lifeline was to prove short lived. A new league, the Northern Counties League, was formed in 1960 and all the former North Eastern League clubs moved to the new competition. Peterborough United were elected to the Football League (the last Midland League club to achieve this feat), and the Midland League closed down through lack of numbers.

After a single year without a Midland League, a re-formed competition entitled the Midland Counties League was formed, although common practice was still to refer to it as the "Midland League" and it is usually treated as a continuation of the former competition in reference sources. A few of the previous member clubs re-joined, with a number of new members, principally from the Central Alliance. With the formation of the Northern Premier League in 1968, the Midland League lost four of its most successful clubs, but by now the competition was a strong league again and more clubs were looking to join than the league had vacancies. To cater for this, the league formed a second division in 1975–76. This division became "Division One" while the previous clubs formed the "Premier Division". Clubs had to achieve a high level of facilities to join the Premier Division, and in the seven seasons in which the two division format was used, no clubs were actually able to move from the lower to the upper tier.

When senior football in the north of England was rationalised in 1982, the Midland League was one of those affected. The league closed down, merging with the Yorkshire League to form the Northern Counties East League as a feeder league to the Northern Premier League.

== Honours ==
Season	Champions
1889–90	Lincoln City
1890–91	Gainsborough Trinity
1891–92	Rotherham Town
1892–93	Rotherham Town
1893–94	Burton Wanderers
1894–95	Loughborough
1895–96	Kettering
1896–97	Doncaster Rovers
1897–98	Mexborough
1898–99	Doncaster Rovers
1899–1900	Kettering
1900–01	Sheffield United reserves
1901–02	Barnsley reserves
1902–03	Sheffield Wednesday reserves
1903–04	Sheffield United reserves
1904–05	Sheffield United reserves
1905–06	Sheffield Wednesday reserves
1906–07	Sheffield United reserves
1907–08	Sheffield Wednesday reserves
1908–09	Lincoln City
1909–10	Chesterfield Town
1910–11	Grimsby Town
1911–12	Rotherham County
1912–13	Rotherham County
1913–14	Rotherham County
1914–15	Rotherham County
1915–16	No competition due to World War I
1916–17	No competition due to World War I
1917–18	No competition due to World War I
1918–19	No competition due to World War I
1919–20	Chesterfield Municipal
1920–21	Lincoln City
1921–22	Worksop Town
1922–23	Sheffield Wednesday reserves
1923–24	Mansfield Town
1924–25	Mansfield Town
1925–26	Mexborough Athletic
1926–27	Scunthorpe & Lindsey United
1927–28	Gainsborough Trinity
1928–29	Mansfield Town
1929–30	Scarborough
1930–31	Grimsby Town reserves
1931–32	Bradford Park Avenue reserves
1932–33	Grimsby Town reserves
1933–34	Grimsby Town reserves
1934–35	Barnsley reserves
1935–36	Barnsley reserves
1936–37	Barnsley reserves
1937–38	Shrewsbury Town
1938–39	Scunthorpe & Lindsey United
1939–40	Not finished due to outbreak of World War II
1940–41	Not played due to World War II
1941–42	Not played due to World War II
1942–43	Not played due to World War II
1943–44	Not played due to World War II
1944–45	Not played due to World War II
1945–46	Shrewsbury Town
1946–47	Grimsby Town reserves
1947–48	Shrewsbury Town
1948–49	Gainsborough Trinity
1949–50	Nottingham Forest reserves
1950–51	Nottingham Forest reserves
1951–52	Nottingham Forest reserves
1952–53	Nottingham Forest reserves
1953–54	Nottingham Forest reserves
1954–55	Notts County reserves
1955–56	Peterborough United
1956–57	Peterborough United
1957–58	Peterborough United
1958–59	Peterborough United
1959–60	Peterborough United
1960–61	Not played due to financial problems
1961–62	Matlock Town
1962–83	Loughborough United
1963–64	Grantham
1964–65	Lockheed Leamington
1965–66	Worksop Town
1966–67	Gainsborough Trinity
1967–68	Ilkeston Town
1968–69	Matlock Town
1969–70	Alfreton Town
1970–71	Grantham
1971–72	Grantham
1972–73	Worksop Town
1973–74	Alfreton Town
1974–75	Boston

Season	Premier Division	First Division
1975–76	Eastwood Town	Brimington
1976–77	Alfreton Town	Long Eaton Grange
1977–78	Brigg Town	Staveley Works
1978–79	Boston	Long Eaton Grange
1979–80	Belper Town	Arnold Kingswell
1980–81	Boston	Borrowash Victoria
1981–82	Shepshed Charterhouse	Staveley Works

=== Election to the Football League ===
The following clubs (with their league position in brackets) were elected from the Midland League to the Football League -

- 1891–92 – Burslem Port Vale (3rd)
- 1892–93 – Rotherham Town (1st)
- 1893–94 – Burton Wanderers (1st) and Leicester Fosse (2nd)
- 1894–95 – Loughborough Town (1st)
- 1895–96 – Gainsborough Trinity (2nd) and Walsall (3rd)
- 1897–98 – Barnsley (2nd), Burslem Port Vale (5th) and Glossop North End (9th)
- 1898–99 – Chesterfield (4th)
- 1900–01 – Doncaster Rovers (2nd)
- 1903–04 – Doncaster Rovers (11th)
- 1904–05 – Stockport County (11th)
- 1908–09 – Lincoln City (1st)
- 1909–10 – Huddersfield Town (5th)
- 1910–11 – Grimsby Town (1st)
- 1914–15 – Rotherham County (1st)
- 1919–20 – Leeds United (12th)
- 1920–21 – Lincoln City (1st), Chesterfield (3rd) and Halifax Town (11th)
- 1922–23 – Doncaster Rovers (2nd)
- 1928–29 – York City (9th)
- 1930–31 – Mansfield Town (10th)
- 1949–50 – Scunthorpe & Lindsey United (3rd) and Shrewsbury Town (10th)
- 1959–60 – Peterborough United (1st)

=== League Cup finals ===
- Premier Division

Note - from 1968–69 to 1974–75, this competition was simply called the Midland League Cup.

Season	Winners	Result	Runners-up	Venue
1968–69	Grantham	3 – 2 (agg)	Arnold	Two legs
1969–70	Warley	3 – 2 (agg)	Heanor Town	Two legs
1970–71	Grantham	4 – 2 (agg)	Arnold	Two legs
1971–72	Alfreton Town	3 – 0 (agg)	Worksop Town	Two legs
1972–73	Alfreton Town	5 – 1 (agg)	Eastwood Town	Two legs
1973–74	Alfreton Town	3 – 1 (agg)	Worksop Town	Two legs
1974–75	Arnold	2 – 1 (agg)	Eastwood Town	Two legs
1975–76	Frickley Athletic	6 – 5 (agg)	Boston	Two legs
1976–77	Boston	2 – 1 (agg)	Alfreton Town	Two legs
1977–78	Eastwood Town	4 – 1 (agg)	Alfreton Town	Two legs
1978–79	Appleby Frodingham	5 – 4 (agg)	Skegness Town	Two legs
1979–80	Eastwood Town	6 – 2 (agg)	Brigg Town	Two legs
1980–81	Bridlington Trinity	9 – 1 (agg)	Arnold	Two legs
1981–82	Shepshed Charterhouse	5 – 2 (agg)	Boston	Two legs

- Division One

Season	Winners	Result	Runners-up	Venue
1975–76	Brimington			
1976–77	Staveley Works			
1977–78	T.I. Chesterfield			
1978–79				
1979–80	Oakham United			
1980–81	Borrowash Victoria			
1981–82	Creswell Colliery	6 – 5 (agg)	Graham Street Prims	Two legs
