= Long Eaton United F.C. =

Association football club in England

Coordinates: 52°53′47″N 1°15′23″W

Long Eaton United
- Full name: Long Eaton United Football Club
- Nickname: The Blues
- Founded: 1956
- Ground: Grange Park, Long Eaton
- Capacity: 1,500 (450 seated)
- Chairman: Nick Dargan
- Manager: Craig Swinscoe and Ben Hutchinson
- League: Northern Premier League Division One Midlands
- 2025–26: Northern Premier League Division One Midlands, 10th of 22
Home colours	Away colours

Long Eaton United Football Club is a football club in Long Eaton, Derbyshire, England. They are currently members of the Northern Premier League Division One Midlands and play at Grange Park.

== History ==
Long Eaton St Helens became members of the new Derbyshire Alliance in 1907, the league having been formed as a rebranded Mid-Derbyshire League. The following year they were founder members of the Notts & Derbyshire League, where they played until becoming founder members of the Central Alliance in 1911. They were champions of the league in 1912–13 before being renamed Long Eaton Town in 1914. In 1925 the club joined the Midland League, but left after two seasons.

Long Eaton Town were re-established in July 1949 and joined the Central Alliance, taking over the fixtures of Mansfield Town 'A' during the 1949–50 season. In 1954–55 the club finished bottom of Division One, although they avoided being relegated to Division Two. In 1956 financial problems led to the club being rebranded as Long Eaton United with a new strip and directors replacing a committee. League restructuring also saw the club moved into Division One South of the Central Alliance. They were Division One South runners-up in 1956–57 and champions in 1958–59.

Long Eaton United moved up to the Midland League in 1961. The club won the Derbyshire Senior Cup in 1964–65 and again in 1975–76, by which time they had become members of the Premier Division after it gained a second division in 1975, and were Premier Division runners-up the following season. In 1982 the Midland League merged with the Yorkshire League to form the Northern Counties East League, with Long Eaton placed in Division One South. After winning Division One South in 1984–85 the club were promoted to the Premier Division.

In 1989 Long Eaton left the Northern Counties East League to join the Supreme Division of the Central Midlands League. Despite finishing fifth in the division in their first season, they were demoted to the Premier Division. League reorganisation saw them playing in the Premier Division South in 1991–92 and then the Premier Division again in 1992–93, a season in which they finished fifth and were promoted back to the Supreme Division. After a third-place finish in the Supreme Division in 2001–02, the club moved up to Division One of the Northern Counties East League.

Long Eaton were Division One runners-up in 2003–04, earning promotion to the Premier Division. They were runners-up in 2008–09, also winning the League Cup. In 2014 the club transferred to the Premier Division of the new Midland League. In the league's 2014–15 they won the Premier Division Cup, beating Rocester 2–0 in the final. At the end of the 2020–21 season the club were transferred to the Premier Division North of the United Counties League. They won the division in 2021–22 and were promoted to Division One East of the Northern Premier League. The club went on to finish fourth in Division One East in 2022–23, qualifying for the promotion play-offs. After beating Hebburn Town 3–2 on penalties in the semi-finals after a 2–2, they defeated Stockton Town 4–3 on penalties (after another 2–2 draw) to earn promotion to the Premier Division Central of the Southern League. However, they finished second-from-bottom of the Premier Division Central the following season, and were relegated to Division One Midlands of the Northern Premier League.

== Ground ==
Long Eaton St Helens played at the Recreation Ground, which had previously been used by Long Eaton Rangers. The new Long Eaton Town played at the stadium after their 1949 establishment, but soon relocated to Grange Park on the other side of the road after difficulties dealing with the stadium owners. A terraced stand was built on one side of the pitch, with another stand erected on the other side in 1957, consisting of a roof over earth banking. More cover for spectators was erected next to the new stand using an old nissen hut. However, the club was unable to enclose the council-owned ground or erect stands behind the goals amid opposition from local residents who considered it to be a public site.

Floodlights were installed in 1998 and the ground was enclosed soon afterwards. A new seated stand, later named the Big Jim Stand, was built on the site of the second stand, with the nissen hut stand replaced with a new covered area. The original stand was also redeveloped and seating installed.

== Honours ==
- United Counties League
  - Premier Division North champions 2021–22
- Midlands League
  - League Cup winners 2014–15
- Northern Counties East League
  - Division One South champions 1984–85
  - League Cup winners 2008–09
- Central Alliance
  - Champions 1912–13
  - Division One South champions 1958–59
- Derbyshire Senior Cup
  - Winners 1964–65, 1975–76

== Records ==
- Best FA Cup performance: Third qualifying round, 1965–66, 1967–68, 1970–71, 1976–77, 2021-22
- Best FA Trophy performance: Third qualifying round 1976–77, 1979–80
- Best FA Vase performance: Quarter-finals, 2020–21
- Record attendance: 2,019 vs Burton Albion, FA Cup third qualifying round, 1970
- Most points in a season: 89, 2021–22
- Most league wins in a season: 28, 2021–22
- Fewest league defeats in a season: 1, 2021–22
- Most league goals scored in a season: 106, 2021–22

== See also ==
- Long Eaton United F.C. players
- Long Eaton United F.C. managers
