= Skegness Town A.F.C. =

Association football club in England

Coordinates: 53.142915°N 0.323680°E

- Full name: Skegness Town Association Football Club
- Nickname: The Lilywhites
- Founded: 1947
- Ground: Vertigo Stadium, Skegness
- Chairman: Jonathan Moses
- Manager: Chris Rawlinson
- League: United Counties League Premier Division North
- 2025–26: United Counties League Premier Division North, 11th of 20

Skegness Town Association Football Club is an English association football club based in the town of Skegness, Lincolnshire. The club currently competes in the United Counties League Premier Division North.

Skegness Town play at the MKM Stadium, Skegness after moving there from Burgh Road in 2017. The club's home kit is a white shirt, red shorts and red socks and the away kit is an orange shirt, orange shorts and orange socks. At the end of the 2017-18 season, the club finished second in the Lincolnshire League

Skegness Town have won the Lincolnshire League seven times, as well as the Lincolnshire Junior County Cup in the 2016/17 season. On top of this, the club has also won the Lincolnshire Football League Cup twice, the Central Alliance South Division three times, the Lincolnshire FA Senior 'B' Cup four times and the Lincolnshire FA Senior 'A' Cup winners six times.

== History ==
The club was founded in 1947, as a successor to the town's two pre-war clubs Skegness United and Skegness Blue Rovers. The latter having one season in the Lincoln & District League (1937–38). After a season in the Boston & District League (using Wainfleet Road Recreation Ground) and then the East Lincs Combination (at the former ground of United in Richmond Drive), the club moved to Burgh Road to become a founder member of the Lincolnshire League in 1948. After two successful seasons in the Central Alliance (South), the club were, 1960–61 apart, when the League was in abeyance, members of the Midland Counties League from 1958 to 1982, finishing as runners-up in 1978–79, missing out on the title on goal difference. The club had a season in its successor, the North Counties (East) League, before returning to the Lincolnshire League in 1983. During the 1977-78 pre-season, Skegness Town played a pre-season match against Brian Clough's Nottingham Forest and nine months later Forest became champions of England.

Until 1985 the club regularly entered the FA Cup but only once reached the first round proper, in 1955–56, when they were defeated 4–0 at home to Worksop Town after beating Barton Town in the first qualifying round, Brigg Town in the second qualifying round, Grantham in the third qualifying round and finally Gainsborough Trinity in the fourth qualifying round. The club's last participation in the FA Cup was in 1985 and a 1st qualifying round trip to face local rivals Goole Town where they lost 3–2. They reentered the F.A. Cup in 2021. Skegness Town entered the first ever FA Trophy competition in 1969–70 and competed until 1976–77 never getting past the qualifying rounds. They switched to the FA Vase, reaching the 4th round in 1978–79 where they lost to Shepshed Charterhouse and the 5th round in 1981–82, losing to Rainworth Miners Welfare. Changes in the ground grading regulations for national competitions ended the club's participation in 1990–91. They next entered the F.A. Vase in 2017.

Since the Lincolnshire FA restructured its cup competitions in 2006, the club competed in its Junior Cup losing the 2007–08 final on penalties. Previously, with some success, the club participated in the Senior 'B' Cup, becoming its first winners and adding a three further wins. For 1956–57 they were promoted to the Senior 'A' Cup winning at their first attempt going on to six wins including a hat-trick between 1968 and 1971.

The club were champions of the Lincolnshire League in 2006–07 and 2007–08, thus winning their third and fourth county league titles. The Lilywhites also won the league in the 2015–16 and 2016–17 seasons.

On 25 May 2018, it was announced that Skegness Town would be promoted to the Northern Counties East Football League Division One, step 10 of the English football pyramid, thus ending a 36-year absence. Following their promotion, it was announced on 30 May 2018 that the former assistant manager of National League North side Boston United Martyn Bunce would be the side's manager for the 2018-19 season, replacing Nick Chapman. On 16 November 2018, it was announced that Nathan Collins would join the club as joint manager with Martyn Bunce. Martyn Bunce stepped down as manager on 28 January 2019, leaving Nathan Collins as the singular manager of the club. In 2021 the club were promoted to the Premier Division North of the United Counties League based on their results in the abandoned 2019–20 and 2020–21 seasons. Nathan Collins left the club in 2022, and Chris Rawlinson was then appointed to the position of manager, having joined the club as assistant manager at the start of the 2019/20 season. The 2023–24 season saw the club win the United Counties League Challenge Cup.

== New ground ==
In early 2016, it was announced that Skegness Town would be moving from Burgh Road to the new Vertigo Stadium. The site of The Lilywhites' old ground Burgh Road had been demolished to construct a small shopping centre and the new location was to be on Wainfleet Road. The ground was completed by mid 2017 for the start of the 2017/18 season. The stadium was officially opened on 21 July 2017 by Mayor Danny Brookes and the occasion was marked by a friendly between Skegness Town and the Lincoln City U18 squad. The game ended with a 3–1 victory to The Lilywhites.

The club's matchday programme "The Lilywhite" is sold at the turnstiles before every home game at the Vertigo Stadium.

== Notable former players and managers ==
This list contains notable former players and managers of Skegness Town A.F.C.

- George Raynor managed Skegness Town from 1958 to 1960 between spells as the national team manager for Sweden, whom he led to the gold medal at the 1948 Olympic games and to the 1958 World Cup final. He had previously been manager at Lazio and Juventus.
- Teslim Balogun, Nigerian international signed from Peterborough United in 1956 for a brief spell before joining QPR.
- George Hutchinson, who played for Sheffield United and Tottenham Hotspur finished his career at Burgh Road.
- Peter Madden, League Cup finalist 1961 with Rotherham United. Finished his career at Skegness Town after signing from Aldershot in 1968.
- Calvin Palmer, started his career at Skegness Town in 1957. League Cup finalist 1964 with Stoke City.
- Ray Veall, started his career at Skegness Town in 1960 before winning the 1962–63 League championship with Everton.
- Charlie Williams, the comedian finished his football career at Skegness after retiring from Doncaster Rovers in 1959.

== Honours ==
- United Counties League
  - League Challenge Cup winners (1) 2023–24
- Lincolnshire League
  - Champions (7) 1951–52, 1955–56, 2006–07, 2007–08, 2013–14, 2015–16 & 2016–17
- Lincolnshire Football League Cup
  - Winners (2) 1951–52 1953–54
- Central Alliance (South)
  - Champions (3) 1956–57, 1957–58 & 1960–61
- Lincolnshire FA Senior 'B' Cup winners
  - Winners (4) 1949–50, 1950–51, 1952–53, & 1955–56
- Lincolnshire FA Senior 'A' Cup winners
  - Winners (6) 1956–57 1959–60, 1968–69, 1969–70, 1970–71 & 1974–75

== Records ==
- FA Cup
  - First round 1955–56
- FA Trophy
  - Second qualifying round 1969–70, 1974–75
- FA Vase
  - Fifth round 1981–82
