= Eastwood Town F.C. =

Coordinates: 53°00′53″N 1°17′52″W

Eastwood Town
- Full name: Eastwood Town Football Club
- Nickname: The Badgers
- Founded: 1953
- Dissolved: 2014; 12 years ago
- Ground: Coronation Park; Eastwood; Nottinghamshire
- Capacity: 5,000
- 2012–13: Northern Premier League; Premier Division, 22nd (relegated)
Home colours	Away colours

Eastwood Town Football Club was an English football club based in Eastwood, Nottinghamshire. The club last participated in the Northern Premier League Division One South, the eighth tier of English football.

A new club, Eastwood C.F.C., was formed in 2014 following the demise of Eastwood Town.

== History ==
Eastwood Town were established in 1955. During the 1970s, the club competed in the Midland League. In 1983, Eastwood were founder members of the Northern Counties East Football League. In 1987, they joined the Northern Premier League but returned to the NCEL for the 2003–04 season.

In the 2008/09 season, Eastwood Town had a successful run in the FA Cup, defeating Wrexham and Wycombe Wanderers on their way to the third round of the competition. Eastwood finished as league champions and were promoted to the Conference North for the first time in their history.

Eastwood Town finished in 4th place in their second season in the Conference North, but were denied permission to take part in the playoffs due to insufficient ground grading. As a result, the club was put up for sale by its owners.

In November 2013, the club was issued with a winding up petition over an unpaid tax bill of £168,000 and council officials barred the club from using the Coronation Park ground.

After postponing five consecutive home games, the club resigned from the Northern Premier League in February 2014.

== Stadium ==
There had been a lot of work done in the background and plans had been drawn up to bring the ground up to the 'A' grade required to enter the Conference National. The plans showed new terracing holding 1900 fans behind both goals and a new seated stand replacing the Mabe Allan Stand almost down the entire length of the pitch. This would have given the club three fully enclosed stands and a capacity of over 5,000.

With the plans for the academy and the other projects, the club was in negotiations with the local authorities to take over the existing all-weather pitch situated within Coronation Park along with the changing rooms. The plan was to redevelop the pitch into a full sized 3G pitch, with the adjoining area being developed into an outdoor juniors pitch for use of the community and Eastwood Town Juniors. This would have given the club the infrastructure to attract the best local youngsters as well as players released from professional clubs academies.

The club had received a few complaints from residents on Chewton Street about the increased problems associated with matchday parking and this was another issue that had been raised and negotiations were in progress with the council to address the situation, with the objective of providing more car parking facilities at the club. The club were also in discussions with the council about additional signage off the A610, and the end of Chewton Street.

== Honours ==
- Midland Counties League
  - Champions 1975–76
  - League Cup winners 1977–78, 1979–80
- Central Alliance
  - Champions 1963–64
- Notts Alliance
  - Champions 1956–57
  - League Cup winners 1955–56
- Nottinghamshire Senior Cup
  - Winners 1975–76, 1977–78, 1978–79, 1979–80, 1982–83, 1983–84, 1988–89, 1989–90, 1991–92, 2003–04, 2005–06, 2006–07, 2007–08, 2009–10, 2010–11, 2011–12
- Evans Halshaw Floodlit Cup
  - Winners 1994–95
- Northern Premier League
  - Challenge Cup winners 2007–08
  - Premier Division winners 2008–09
- Notts Intermediate Cup
  - Winners 1986–87, 1998–99, 1999–2000
- Ripley Hospital Charity Cup
  - Winners on six occasions
- Midlands Regional Alliance
  - Premier Division champions 1999–2000
  - Challenge Cup winners 2001–02
- Northern Counties East Football League
  - Presidents Cup winners 2003–04

== Records ==
- Attendance: 2,723 v Enfield, FA Amateur Cup, February 1965
- Goalscorers: Peter Knox 259 goals between 2004 and 2011
- Appearances: Arthur Rowley, over 800 first team games (1959–76) and not a single booking
- Win: 21–0 v Rufford Colliery 26 October 1954 and Ilkeston Town 10 May 1969
- Loss: 0–8 v Hucknall Town (a) 13 February 2001
- Fee Paid: Believed to be around £9,000 for Danny Holland, Harrogate Town, 2008–09
- Fee Received: £72,500 for Richard Liburd, Middlesbrough, 1992–93
