= Nottinghamshire Senior Cup =

- Organiser(s): Nottinghamshire County FA
- Founded: 1883; 143 years ago
- Region: Nottinghamshire
- Teams: 24 (2025–26)
- Current champions: Basford United F.C. (7th title)
- Most championships: Nottingham Forest (18 titles)
- Website: Nottinghamshire FA

The Nottinghamshire Senior Cup or Nottinghamshire Saturday Senior Cup is the county senior cup of the Nottinghamshire County FA. It was first won by Nottingham Forest in 1883–84 when they defeated Notts Trent 5–0 in the finals. Although first team of professional sides no longer compete as their reserves team competes in the competition, the cup has been previously won by Nottingham Forest, Notts County and Mansfield Town.

The current champions are Basford United, who defeated Kimberley Miners Welfare 2-1 in the 2025–26 finals.

== Teams ==
A total of 24 teams competed for the 2023–24 season. Title holders Newark & Sherwood United, Basford United, Carlton Town, Dunkirk, Gedling Miners Welfare, Mansfield Town, Nottingham Forest U21s and Notts County reserves entered in quarter-finals.

Team	Stadium	League
A.F.C. Mansfield	Forest Town Arena	United Counties League Premier Division North
Basford United	Greenwich Avenue	Northern Premier League Premier Division
Carlton Town	Bill Stokeld Stadium	Northern Premier League Division One East
Clifton All Whites	Norman Archer Memorial	United Counties League Division One
Clipstone	Lido Ground	United Counties League Division One
Dunkirk	Ron Steel Sports Ground	United Counties League Division One
Eastwood C.F.C.	Coronation Park	United Counties League Premier Division North
Gedling Miners Welfare	Plains Road	United Counties League Division One
Hucknall Town	Ariel Way	United Counties League Premier Division North
Kimberley Miners Welfare	The Stag Ground	United Counties League Premier Division North
Mansfield Town	Field Mill	League Two
Newark & Sherwood United (TH)	The JRL Brickwork Stadium	United Counties League Premier Division North
Newark Town	YMCA Sports Village	United Counties League Division One
Nottingham Forest U21s	The City Ground	U21 Premier League
Notts County reserves	Meadow Lane	Central League
Ollerton Town	Walesby Lane Sports Ground	Central Midlands Alliance League Premier Division North
Radford	Selhurst Street	United Counties League Division One
Rainworth Miners Welfare	Welfare Ground	United Counties League Division One
Retford	SL2 Railroad	Northern Counties East Football League Division One
Retford United	Cannon Park	Northern Counties East Football League Division One
Selston	The Parish Hall Ground	United Counties League Division One
Sherwood Colliery	Debdale Park	United Counties League Premier Division North
Southwell City	Centenary Ground	United Counties League Division One
West Bridgford	Regatta Way Sports Ground	United Counties League Division One

== Finals ==
This section lists every final of the competition played since 1883–84, the winners, the runners-up, and the result.

=== Key ===
Match went to a replay
Match went to extra time
Match decided by a penalty shootout after extra time
Shared trophy

Season	Winners	Result	Runner-up	Venue	Notes
1883–84	Nottingham Forest	5–0	Notts Trent	Castle Ground	after 1–1 draw at the Castle Ground
1884–85	Notts County	walkover	Nottingham Forest		
1885–86	Nottingham Forest	1–0	Notts Rangers	Castle Ground	
1886–87	Nottingham Forest	3–0	Notts Olympic	Gregory Ground	
1887–88	Notts Rangers	4–2	Ruddington	Castle Ground	
1888–89	Notts Rangers	7–0	Ruddington	Gregory Ground	
1889–90	Beeston	3–1	Newark	Castle Ground	
1890–91	Nottingham Forest	2–1	Ruddington	Town Ground	
1891–92	Greenhalgh's	3–1	Wilkinson's (Beeston)	Town Ground	
1892–93	Greenhalgh's	2–1	Notts Olympic	Hucknall	
1893–94	Bulwell United	1–0	Newstead Byron	Hucknall	
1894–95	Newark	2–0	Notts County Reserves	Bulwell	
1895–96	Nottingham Forest Reserves	2–1	Newstead Byron	Bulwell	
1896–97	Nottingham Forest Reserves	2–0	Hucknall St John's	Trent Bridge	
1897–98	Hucknall St John's	1–0	Nottingham Forest Reserves	Bulwell	
1898–99	Nottingham Forest Reserves	4–1	Newark	City Ground	
1899–1900	Notts County Reserves	2–1	Sutton Town	Cinderhill Road, Bulwell	after 2–2 draw at the City Ground
1900–01	Notts County Reserves	2–0	Newark	Cinderhill Road, Bulwell	
1901–02	Nottingham Forest	2–0	Notts County	City Ground	after 2–2 draw at the City Ground
1902–03	Notts County	2–0	Arnold	City Ground	after 1–1 draw at the City Ground
1903–04	Newark	2–0	Arnold	City Ground	
1904–05	Nottingham Forest	2–0	Newark	City Ground	
1905–06	Newark	2–0	Nottingham Forest	City Ground	
1906–07	Nottingham Forest	4–1	Notts Magdala	City Ground	
1907–08	Nottingham Forest	–	Notts County reserves	Churchville	Replay
1908–09	Sutton Town		Stanton Hill Victoria	Mansfield Mechanics	
1909–10	Nottingham Forest	3–0	Eastwood Rangers	Stanhope Street	
1910–11	Notts County	1–0	Sutton Junction	City Ground	
1911–12	Notts County	8–2	Stanton Hill Victoria	Westfield Lane	
1912–13	Sutton Town	2–1	Sutton Junction	Field Mill	
1913–14	Sutton Town	3–1	Sutton Junction	Field Mill	
1914–1919	No competition due to World War I.				
1919–20	Nottingham Forest	–	Hucknall Colliery	Field Mill	Replay
1920–21	Nottingham Forest	–	Mansfield Town	Meadow Lane	Replay
1921–22	Welbeck Colliery	4–2	Nottingham Forest	Field Mill	
1922–23	Mansfield Town	2–1	Newark Athletic	Sutton Town	
1923–24	Sutton Town	1–0	Newark Town	City Ground	
1924–25	Notts County	1–0	Nottingham Forest	Field Mill	
1925–26	Mansfield Town	6–0	Players Athletic	Sutton Town	
1926–27	Mansfield Town	5–1	Notts County	Sutton Town	
1927–28	Nottingham Forest	2–1	Notts County	Field Mill	
1928–29	Notts County	4–2	Nottingham Forest	Field Mill	
1929–30	Nottingham Forest	4–0	Newark Town	Meadow Lane	
1930–31	Mansfield Town	7–0	Notts County	Field Mill	
1931–32	Mansfield Town	1–0	Nottingham Forest	Field Mill	
1932–33	Nottingham Forest	3–2	Newark Town	Northern Road	
1933–34	Notts County	4–3	Nottingham Forest	Field Mill	
1934–35	Notts County	3–2	Nottingham Forest	Meadow Lane	
1935–36	Notts County	3–2	Newark Town	Newark Town	Extra-time
1936–37	Raleigh Athletic	3–0	Ollerton Colliery	Meadow Lane	
1937–38	Ollerton Colliery	4–1	Ransome & Marles	Newark Town	
1938–39	Players Athletic	4–3	Ollerton Colliery	Newark Town	Extra-time
1939–1945	No competition due to World War II.				
1945–46	Bestwood Colliery	1–0	Gedling Colliery	Newark Town	Extra-time
1946–47	Basford United	4–2	Gedling Colliery	Meadow Lane	
1947–48	Ransome & Marles		Gedling Colliery	Meadow Lane	
1948–49	Retford Town	3–1	Ollerton Colliery	Meadow Lane	
1949–50	Linby Colliery	1–0	Retford Town	City Ground	
1950–51	Retford Town	4–0	Linby Colliery		
1951–52	Linby Colliery	–	Retford Town	Meadow Lane	Replay
1952–53	Gedling Colliery	4–0	Sutton Town	Meadow Lane	
1953–54	Linby Colliery				
1954–55	Retford Town				
1955–56	Sutton Town				
1956–57	Ransome & Marles		Sutton Town		
1957–58	Sutton Town				
1958–59	Retford Town	3–1	Arnold St Mary's	Meadow Lane	Replay
1959–60	Sutton Town				
1960–61	Arnold St Mary's				
1961–62	Sutton Town				
1962–63	Sutton Town				
1963–64	Sutton Town				
1964–65	Arnold				
1965–66	Arnold				
1966–67	Retford Town				
1967–68	Sutton Town				
1968–69	Arnold				
1969–70	Sutton Town				
1970–71	Arnold				
1971–72	Sutton Town				
1972–73	Sutton Town				
1973–74	Sutton Town				
1974–75	Sutton Town				
1975–76	Eastwood Town				
1976–77	Sutton Town				
1977–78	Eastwood Town				
1978–79	Eastwood Town				
1979–80	Eastwood Town				
1980–81	Rainworth Miners Welfare				
1981–82	Rainworth Miners Welfare				
1982–83	Eastwood Town	5–2	Rainworth Miners Welfare	Gedling Road	
1983–84	Eastwood Town	6–1	Hucknall Colliery Welfare	Gedling Road	
1984–85	Hucknall Colliery Welfare	2–0	Arnold	Coronation Park	
1985–86	Clipstone Welfare				
1986–87	Huthwaite	1–0	Rainworth Miners Welfare		
1987–88	Basford United				
1988–89	Eastwood Town	3–0	Southwell City		
1989–90	Eastwood Town	4–1	Hucknall Town	Field Mill	
1990–91	Hucknall Town	3–0	Clipstone Welfare	Coronation Park	
1991–92	Eastwood Town	2–0	Nottinghamshire Police		
1992–93	Arnold Town	3–1	Rainworth Miners Welfare	Coronation Park	
1993–94	Clipstone Welfare	3–2	Boots Athletic	Field Mill	
1994–95	Oakham United	3–0	Clipstone Welfare		
1995–96	Arnold Town	2–0	Boots Athletic		
1996–97	Arnold Town	1–0	Boots Athletic	Field Mill	
1997–98	Hucknall Town	2–1	Pelican		
1998–99	Arnold Town	2–1	Hucknall Town		
1999–2000	Hucknall Town	2–1	Eastwood Town	Coronation Park	
2000–01	Hucknall Town	1–0	Gedling Town	Meadow Lane	
2001–02	Gedling Town	1–0	Southwell City	Meadow Lane	
2002–03	Hucknall Town	2–0	Teversal		
2003–04	Eastwood Town	2–0	Hucknall Town		
2004–05	Arnold Town	2–0	Eastwood Town		
2005–06	Eastwood Town	2–0	Sutton Town		
2006–07	Eastwood Town	0–0	Arnold Town		Penalties
2007–08	Eastwood Town	2–0	Ollerton Town		
2008–09	Retford United	2–1	Eastwood Town		
2009–10	Eastwood Town	4–3	Retford United	Meadow Lane	Extra-time
2010–11	Eastwood Town	6–1	Carlton Town	Field Mill	
2011–12	Eastwood Town	2–0	Clifton	Aerial Way	
2012–13	Carlton Town	5–2	Sutton Town (2007)	Coronation Park	
2013–14	Carlton Town	6–2	Rainworth Miners Welfare	Hucknall Town F.C.	
2014–15	Basford United	5–3	Clipstone Welfare	Field Mill	
2015–16	Basford United	2–2	Clipstone Welfare	Coronation Park	Penalties
2016–17	Carlton Town	4–1	Basford United	Meadow Lane	
2017–18	Basford United	5–1	Dunkirk	Coronation Park	
2018–19	Basford United	3–0	Carlton Town	Field Mill	
2019–2021	No competition due to COVID-19 pandemic.				
2021–22	Carlton Town	3–0	Mansfield Town U23	Greenwich Avenue	
2022–23	Newark & Sherwood United	3–2	Carlton Town	Coronation Park	
2023–24	Nottingham Forest Under-21s	2–0	Basford United	Coronation Park	
2024–25	Hucknall Town	6-6 (p. 4-3)	Newark & Sherwood United	Field Mill	Penalties
2025–26	Basford United	2–1	Kimberley Miners Welfare	Field Mill	

=== Wins by teams ===
Club	Winners	Last win	Runners-up	Last Final	Notes
Nottingham Forest	18	2023–24	7	2023–24	Won 1 title with Nottingham Forest U21.
Sutton Town †	17	1976–77	3	1976–77	Dissolved in 1997.
Eastwood Town †	16	2011–12	3	2011–12	Dissolved in 2014.
Notts County	11	1935–36	6	1935–36	
Hucknall Town	7	2024-25	3	2024-25	Won 1 title as Hucknall Colliery Welfare
Basford United	7	2025–26	2	2025–26	
Arnold †	5	1970–71	4	1984–85	Won 1 title as Arnold St. Mary's. Dissolved in 1989.
Mansfield Town	5	1931–32	2	2021–22	Won 1 title with Mansfield Town U23.
Retford Town †	5	1966–67	2	1966–67	Dissolved in 1985.
Arnold Town	5	2004–05	1	2006–07	
Carlton Town	4	2021–22	3	2022–23	
Newark †	3	1905–06	4	1905–06	Dissolved in 1914.
Linby Colliery	3	1953–54	1	1953–54	
Clipstone Welfare	2	1993–94	4	2015–16	
Rainworth Miners Welfare	2	1981–82	4	2013–14	
Notts Rangers †	2	1888–89	1	1888–89	Dissolved in 1890.
Ransome & Marles †	2	1956–57	1	1956–57	Dissolved in 1995.
Greenhalgh's †	2	1892–93	0	1892–93	Dissolved in 1894.
Ollerton Colliery †	1	1937–38	3	1948–49	Dissolved in 1941.
Gedling Colliery	1	1952–53	3	1952–53	
Gedling Town †	1	2001–02	1	2000–01	Dissolved in 2011.
Players Athletic †	1	1938–39	1	1938–39	
Retford United	1	2008–09	1	2009–10	
Beeston †	1	1889–90	0	1889–90	Dissolved in 1896.
Bulwell United	1	1893–94	0	1893–94	
Hucknall St John's †	1	1897–98	0	1897–98	
Raleigh Athletic †	1	1936–37	0	1936–37	Dissolved in 1991.
Bestwood Colliery	1	1945–46	0	1945–46	
Huthwaite †	1	1986–87	0	1986–87	
Newark & Sherwood United	1	2022–23	1	2024-25	
Oakham United †	1	1994–95	0	1994–95	Dissolved in 1996.
Welbeck Colliery †	1	1921–22	0	1921–22	Dissolved in 2010.
