= Streett =

- Language: Ancient Latin; Old English

Origin
- Meaning: Roman road

Streett is a surname.

== People with the surname ==
- Abraham J. Streett, American politician
- Harry Streett Baldwin (1894–1952), American politician
- John Streett (born 1762), American colonel
- Joseph M. Streett (1838–1921), American politician
- St. Clair Streett (1893–1970), American general
- Walter Garland Streett (1868–1932), American politician from Arkansas

== Other uses ==
- Col. John Streett House, historic home located at Street, Harford County, Maryland, United States
- Streett automaton, a class of ω-automaton that runs on infinite, rather than finite, strings

== See also ==
- Street (surname)
- Streat
- Street
- Strete
