= Street (surname) =

- Language: Old English

Origin
- Meaning: Roman road

Street is an English surname, deriving from the Latin strata, via the Old English stræt, referring to a Roman road. As a toponymic surname, the name may be derived from the villages of Strete in Devon, England, and Streat in Sussex, England. A branch from an English family Street fixated in Portugal, which surname, currently, appears to be used only by the descendants of the Street de Arriaga e Cunha Viscounts and Counts of Carnide. Its arms are: gules, three St. Catherine's wheels argent; crest: a lion assaltant or, against a St. Catherine's wheel gules.

== People with the surname ==
- Adrian Street (1940–2023), Welsh wrestler
- Alan Street (born 1982), British figure skater
- Alfred Street (cricket umpire) (1869–1951), English cricketer
- Alfred Billings Street (1811–1881), American poet
- Alicia Street (1911–2016), American author and editor
- Andy Street (born 1963), British politician
- Anne Penfold Street (1932–2016), Australian mathematician
- Anthony Austin Street (1926–2022), Australian politician
- A. G. Street (1892–1966), British farmer, writer and broadcaster
- Ben Street (ice hockey) (born 1987), Canadian ice hockey player
- Chris Street (1972–1993), American basketball player
- Craig Street, American record producer
- Danny Street (1941–2010), Scottish singer
- David Street (1917–1971), American actor and singer
- Deborah Street (born 1957), Australian statistician
- Gabby Street (1882–1951), American baseball player and broadcaster
- Geoffrey Austin Street (1894–1940), Australian politician
- George Edmund Street (1824–1881), British architect
- George Street (West Virginia politician), member of the West Virginia House of Delegates
- Huston Street (born 1983), American baseball player
- Ian Ewen-Street (born 1949), New Zealand politician
- Jack Street (footballer, born 1928) (1928–2019), English footballer for Tranmere Rovers
- Jack Street (footballer, born 1934), English footballer for Bradford City
- James Street (quarterback) (1948–2013), American footballer
- James Street (cricketer) (1838–1906), English cricketer
- James H. Street (1903–1954), American theologian
- Janet Street-Porter (born 1946), British journalist and broadcaster
- Jessie Street (1889–1970), Australian feminist
- John Street (disambiguation), several people, including

- John Street (footballer, born 1926) (1926–1988), English footballer for Liverpool
- John Street (Australian politician) (1832–1891), MP for East Sydney
- John Street (snooker referee) (1932–2009), British snooker referee
- John Alfred Street (1822–1889), British Army general
- John Ambrose Street (1795–1865), Canadian lawyer and politician
- John F. Street (born 1943), American lawyer and mayor of Philadelphia
- Cecil John Charles Street (1884–1964), British MI7 officer and novelist

- Joseph M. Street (1782–1840), US Army general
- Julian Leonard Street (1879–1947), American author
- Sir Kenneth Whistler Street (1890–1972), Australian judge
- Kentavius Street (born 1997), American football player
- Sir Laurence Whistler Street (1926–2018), Australian judge
- Maryan Street (born 1955), New Zealand politician
- Mel Street (1933–1978), American country music singer
- Milton Street (1941–2022), American politician
- Nic Street (born 1979), Australian politician
- Norman Street (cricketer) (1881–1915), English soldier and cricketer
- Sir Philip Whistler Street (1863–1938), Australian judge
- Picabo Street (born 1971), American skier
- Richard Street (1942–2013), American soul and R&B singer
- Sandy Street, Australian judge and naval commander
- Sarah Street (born 1958), British academic
- Sharif Street (born 1974), American politician
- Sharon Street (born 1973), American philosopher
- Stephen Street (born 1960), British music producer
- Steve Street (born 1950), American politician
- Thomas Street (astronomer) (1621–1689), English astronomer
- Sir Thomas Street (1625–1696), English judge
- Thomas Clark Street (1814–1872), Canadian politician
- Tony Street (1926–2022), Australian politician

=== Fictional characters ===
- Della Street, secretary of Perry Mason in the original novels and their radio and TV adaptations
- Jason Street, quarterback of the Dillon Panthers in the American TV series Friday Night Lights
- Jim Street, LAPD officer in the 1970s TV series S.W.A.T.

== Street family of Australia ==
- Street family, Australian family

== See also ==
- George Streets (1893–1958), English footballer
- Will Streets (1886–1916), English soldier and poet of the First World War
- Streett (disambiguation)
- Strete
- Streat
