= John Street =

John Street may refer to:

== People ==
=== Association football ===
- John Street (footballer, born 1926) (1926–1988), English footballer for Liverpool, Sheffield Wednesday and Rotherham United who played as a goalkeeper
- Jack Street (footballer, born 1928) (1928–2019), English footballer for Tranmere Rovers, Southport, Bootle Athletic, Reading, Barrow and Netherfield who played as a wing half
- Jack Street (footballer, born 1934) (1934–2007), English footballer for Bradford City and Lincoln City who played as a winger

=== Others ===
- John Street (Australian politician) (1832–1891), Australian member of parliament for East Sydney
- John Street (snooker referee) (1932–2009), British snooker referee
- John Alfred Street (1822–1889), General Officer Commanding, Ceylon
- John Ambrose Street (1795–1865), Canadian lawyer and political figure in New Brunswick
- John F. Street (born 1943), American politician and former mayor of Philadelphia
- Cecil John Charles Street (1884–1964), also known as John Street, British soldier, and novelist

== Streets ==
- John Street (Toronto), Ontario, Canada
- John Street (Markham), Ontario, Canada
- John Street (Hamilton, Ontario)
- John Street, part of Ontario Highway 136, Canada
- John Street (Manhattan), New York, United States

== See also ==
- 170–176 John Street, historic building in New York
- 116 John Street, historic building in New York
- John Street Theatre, New York
- John Street Methodist Church, Manhattan
- John Street House, historic building in Ohio
- John Street Roundhouse, preserved railway roundhouse in Ontario
- John Streett (born 1762), American politician and military officer from Maryland
- John Strete (died c. 1414), MP for Dover
