= City Ground =

Football stadium in Nottinghamshire, England

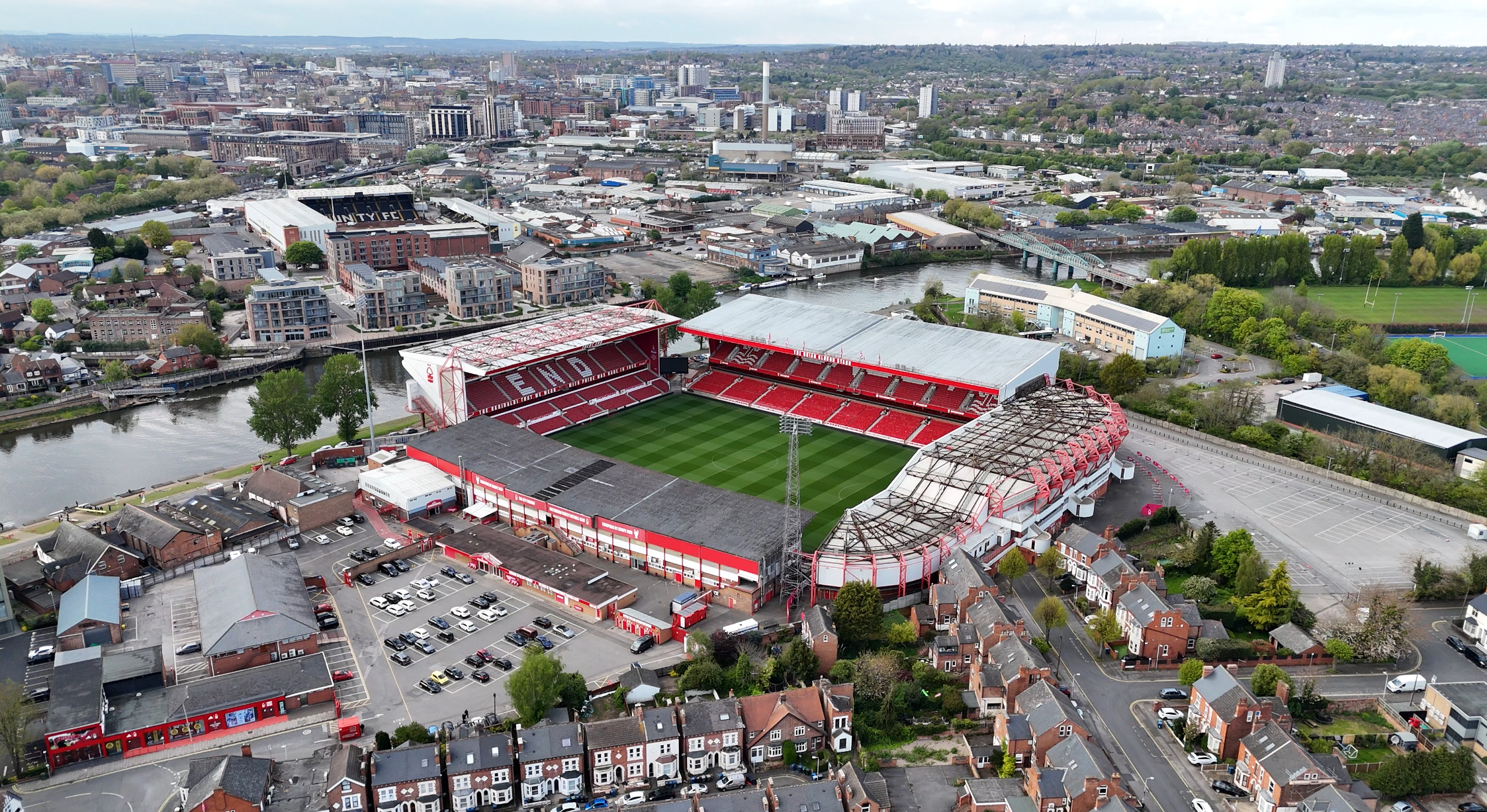
- City Ground in April 2024
- Interactive map of City Ground
- Full name: The City Ground
- Address: Pavilion Road
- Location: The City Ground; West Bridgford, Nottinghamshire, England; NG2 5FJ
- Coordinates: 52°56′24″N 1°7′58″W
- Owner: Nottingham Forest
- Operator: Nottingham Forest
- Capacity: 31,212
- Surface: Grass (Undersoil Heating)
- Scoreboard: ADI
- Record attendance: 49,946 (Nottingham Forest vs Manchester United, 28 October 1967)
- Field size: 114.8 x 77.6 yards (105 x 71 metres)
- Public transit: Nottingham; Victoria Embankment

Construction
- Built: 1898
- Opened: 3 September 1898
- Expanded: 1957 (Former East Stand), 1965 (Peter Taylor Stand), 1980 (Brian Clough Stand), 1992–1993 (Bridgford Stand), 1994–1996 (Trent End)
- Architects: Husband & Co (1980), Miller Partnership (1992–1993, 1994–1996)
- General contractor: Taylor Woodrow (1992–1993, 1994–1996)

Tenants
- Nottingham Forest (1898–present); Nottingham Forest Women (2024–present)

The City Ground is a football stadium in West Bridgford, Nottinghamshire, England, on the banks of the River Trent. It has been home to Nottingham Forest since 1898 and has a capacity of 31,212, with plans to increase capacity to 45,000 and eventually to 52,500.

The stadium was a venue when England hosted UEFA Euro 1996, and is only three hundred yards (270 m) away from Meadow Lane, home of Forest's neighbouring club Notts County; the two grounds are the closest professional football stadiums in England and the second-closest in the United Kingdom, after Tannadice Park and Dens Park. They are located on opposite sides of the River Trent.

== History ==
=== Background ===
Nottingham Forest are the third oldest league football club in the world behind Notts County 1862 and Stoke 1863, and were founded in 1865, but did not move to the City Ground, their seventh home, until 33 years later in 1898. For their first fourteen years the club played most of their matches at the Forest Recreation Ground, from which they took their name. This was common land so the club were unable to exploit their matches commercially, and as there was no gate money, revenue came mainly from the players' membership fees. When Forest first entered the FA Cup in 1878–79, reaching the semi-finals, they were unable to play home fixtures, as the cup competition rules stipulated that spectators should be charged admission. In 1879 the club left The Forest to play at the Castle Ground in The Meadows, after the Notts Castle Football Club which had previously played there disbanded and its players joined Forest. This allowed Forest to charge admission in time for its second FA Cup campaign in 1879–80. Rapidly-growing interest in the game saw the ability to accommodate large numbers of spectators at football matches increase in importance, and from 1880 most of the club's important games were played at Trent Bridge Cricket Ground, then Nottingham's most advanced enclosed sports venue. In 1883, however, Forest were abruptly replaced as tenants at Trent Bridge by local rivals Notts County, a move possibly connected with Notts County's appointment of the assistant secretary of Nottinghamshire County Cricket Club to their own newly created post of paid Club Secretary.

Forest only discovered they were being replaced at Trent Bridge in early August 1883, leaving them very little time to find a new ground, and the Parkside Ground in Lenton, where Forest first played on 22 September, was criticised for its distance from the town, its slope and its uneven surface, with one newspaper columnist commenting that "so long as the Forest Club will maintain a ground on which it is impossible for them to play their particular game accurately, in addition to being bleak and generally inaccessible, they will meet with little patronage". Despite moving three years later to the nearby Gregory Ground, which was much better reviewed in the press, Lenton's distance from the centre of Nottingham saw attendances continue to decline and in 1890 the club moved again, this time to the Town Ground in The Meadows, which was much closer to the club's roots and became Forest's first proper football stadium.

In July 1897, the Town Ground was briefly renamed the City Ground, in recognition of Nottingham being granted city status, but the newly formed city council planned to redevelop the site for building and terminated Forest's lease, offering instead the site on the south side of the river that would become today's City Ground. This land had been granted to the mayor and burgesses of Nottingham by Edward VI in a royal charter dated 21 February 1551, with the intention that rentals from the agricultural land would pay for the upkeep of the adjacent Trent Bridge. The City Council granted the club a 21-year lease on the new site, and the club approved the scheme to move to the new ground at their annual meeting in December 1897. To raise the £3,000 required to finance the move the club asked members, supporters and businessmen to subscribe to "New Ground Scheme" bonds which cost £5 each, raising over £2,000. Many of the bonds were never redeemed, the bondholders effectively making a donation to fund the new ground.

=== Early years ===
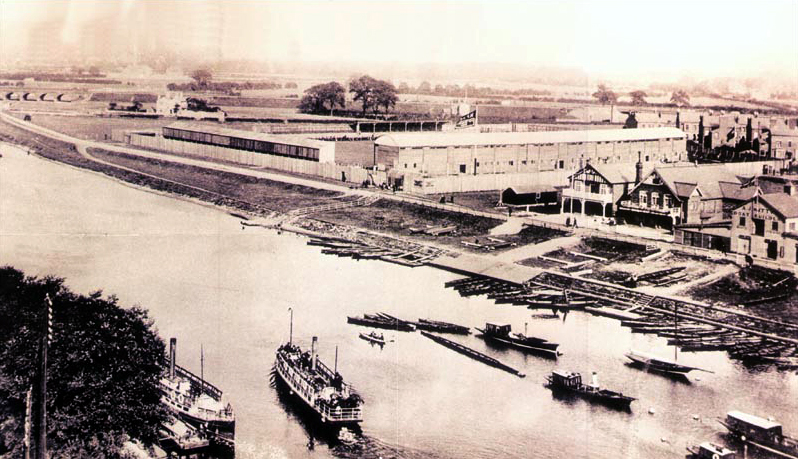
The City Ground in 1898, the year of its opening

Forest first played at the new City Ground a week before their FA Cup final victory in April 1898, and the reserve team played there on the afternoon of the final itself, but the ground was not officially opened until the first match of the following season, a Division One game against Blackburn Rovers on 3 September 1898 with an attendance of 15,000. The ground had a wooden-slatted main stand on the west side with a barrel roof, a narrow wooden shelter covering the full width of the Trent End, and a shorter roof covering part of the east side. The pitch was considered to be among the finest in the country, "a velvet carpet of lush turf". This was the result of the work of club committee-member William Bardill, a nurseryman and landscape gardener whose family firm still exists in Stapleford. Bardill excavated the playing area to a depth of two feet, lay a bed of clinker to ensure perfect drainage, and on top lay a pitch of high-quality turf brought by barge up the river from Radcliffe-on-Trent.

Forest's first round FA Cup match against Aston Villa in 1898 attracted a crowd of 32,070, the first time a football match in Nottingham had attracted gate receipts of over £1,000. The ground was considered to be "one of the best in the country" and was chosen to host the FA Cup Semi final in 1899, recognition that was proclaimed at the club's annual meeting to be "beneficial to the club and the city". The ground held a total of four FA Cup semi-finals between 1899 and 1905, and a full international match between England and Wales in 1909.

Throughout the 1900s, Notts County also regularly used the City Ground for home matches when their usual venue at Trent Bridge was unavailable for football due to cricket taking precedence.

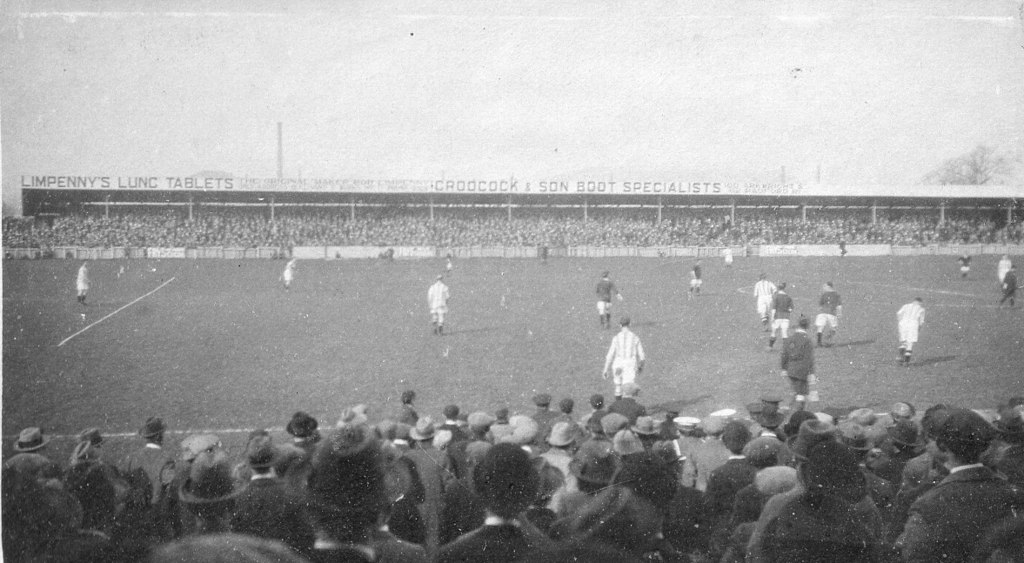
Forest playing at the City Ground c. 1921

The new ground was also called the City Ground. It was only half a mile from the old City Ground. Nottingham was granted its Charter as a city in 1897 and the name was changed from the Town Ground to the City Ground to commemorate this. The City Ground was the first football ground to have elliptically shaped goalposts when it was presented with a new set of goals by the Nottingham-based Standard Goals Company in 1922. Before this, goalposts had usually been round or square. This shape eventually became commonplace, but the FA's ruling in 1938 that the 8-yard width of a goal should be measured from the inside of such posts meant that the City Ground's goals had been two inches too narrow for the preceding sixteen years.

In 1935, the club declined an opportunity to buy the ground from Nottingham Corporation for £7,000.

During World War II, the City Ground held a variety of events to entertain off-duty servicemen, including boxing, horse gymkhanas, and visits from zoos. The pitch was badly damaged by bombing on the night of 8–9 May 1941, with repairs costing £75 9s 11d.

=== Post war ===
The City Ground was flooded after the adjacent River Trent burst its banks in March 1947, with Forest having to play some home fixtures at Meadow Lane. Many archives and official records were damaged and floodwaters reached as high as the crossbars of the goals, with swans seen swimming the full length of the pitch.

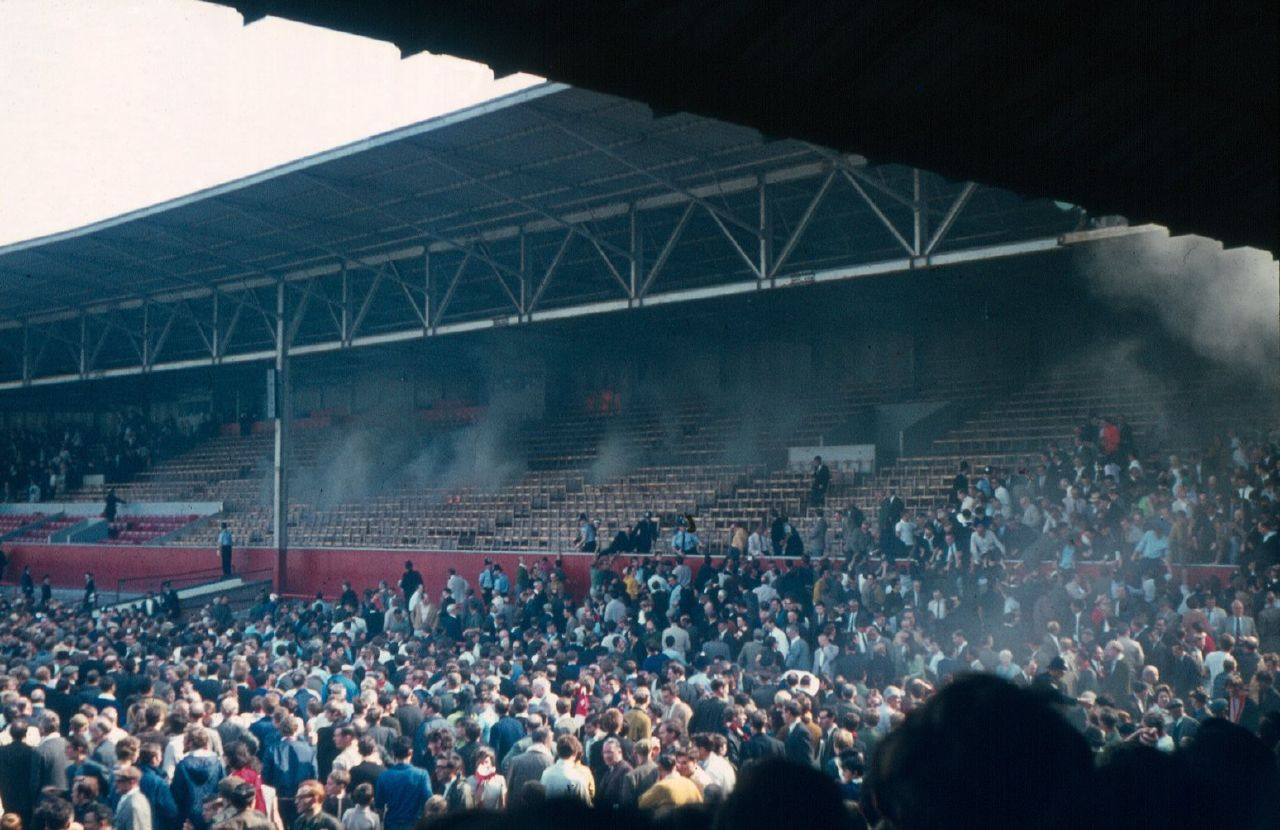
Fans evacuating the Main Stand after it caught fire on 24 August 1968

After winning promotion in 1950, Forest drew up plans for redeveloping the City Ground, and detailed plans were drawn up by local architects Reginald Cooper and Partners in 1951. The first step was the extension and covering of the Trent End in 1954, though a planned second tier of seats at this end was never built. On 12 October 1957, a new East Stand opened, costing £40,000 and having benches to seat up to 2,500 fans to the rear of the terrace. Together with improvements to the Colwick Road Terrace this gave the ground an increased capacity of 48,000, with 6,500 seats for the club's first season in the First Division since 1925. The visitors for the opening were Manchester United's "Busby Babes", just four months before eight of them died in the Munich air disaster, and the match on 12 October 1957 saw a new record attendance of 47,804.

Although Forest had pioneered floodlit football matches, holding a game illuminated by Wells lights at the Gregory Ground in March 1889, the City Ground was the second from last top division ground to install permanent floodlights. The floodlights at the ground were first used on 11 September 1961 as Forest faced Gillingham in the League Cup. Four 120 ft pylons were built, one in each corner of the ground, with each pylon holding a bank of thirty-six 1,500 watt lights. The ground's all-time record attendance of 49,946 was set in October 1967 when Forest beat Manchester United 3–1 in a First Division fixture, five months after Forest had finished second to United in the league.

In December 1967, the City Ground was host to an England U23 match against Italy.

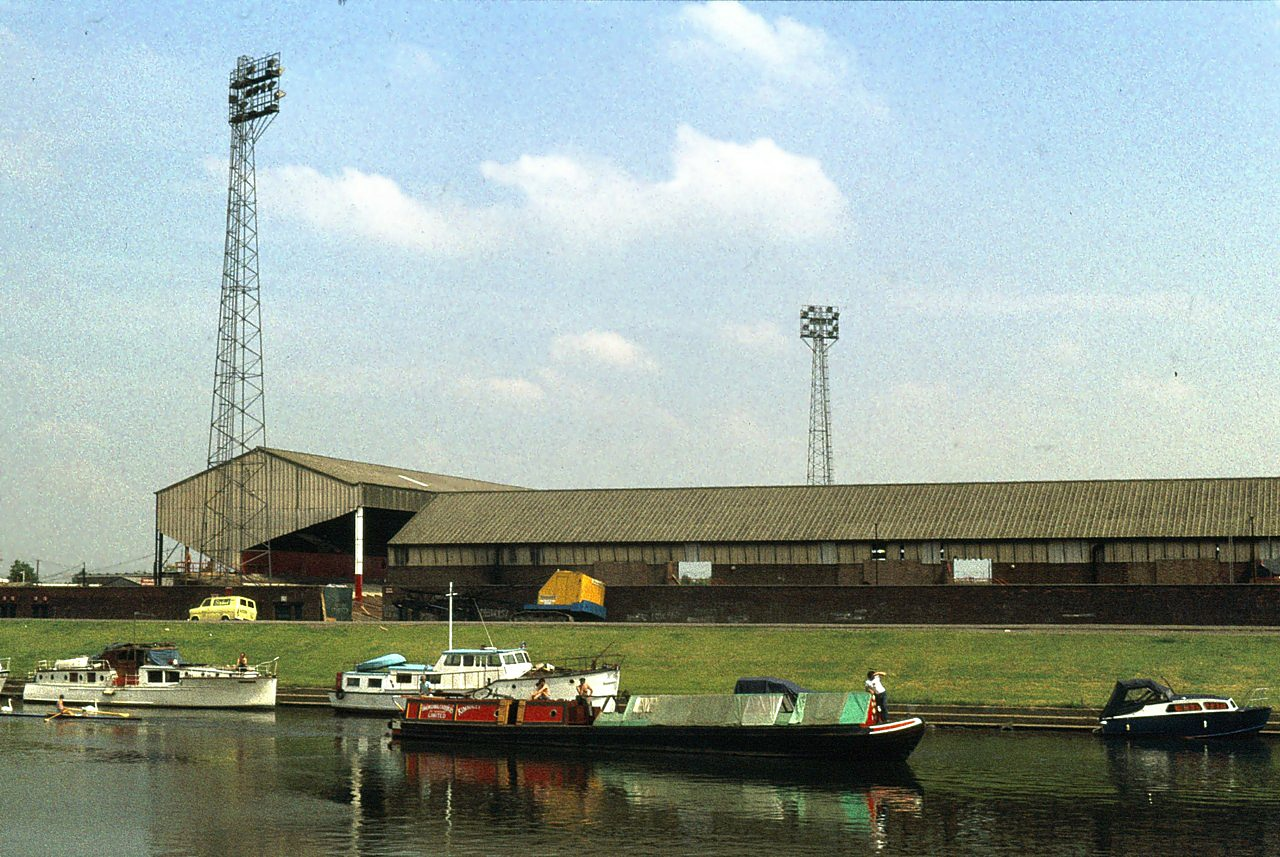
The City Ground from the River Trent in 1978, with the East Stand (left) and the Trent End (right)

The Main Stand was re-roofed, extended and refurbished between 1962 and 1965, with new offices, changing rooms, kit stores, medical suites and press rooms to the rear. On 24 August 1968, however, fire broke out in the stand during a First Division game against Leeds United. It started near the dressing rooms and spread rapidly through the largely wooden structure. The stand was damaged but, despite a crowd numbering 31,126, none of them was injured. The only reported injuries were to a television crew on the gantry, who had to scramble down it because the access ladder was stored in the boiler room. The gantry was extended the length of the stand and now has access at both ends. Many of the club's records, trophies and other memorabilia were also lost in the fire. The stand's roof was undamaged, however, allowing the club to rebuild the base of the stand underneath it in concrete and steel. As a result of the fire, Forest played six "home" matches at Meadow Lane, losing all of them, and after returning to the City Ground used the changing rooms of nearby Trent Bridge while the Main Stand was rebuilt.

The Executive Stand was opened in August 1980 and was built at a cost of £2.5 million – largely from proceeds of the highly successful era in which Forest won consecutive League Cups, the League title and consecutive European Cups.

Under Clough's reign, Forest had taken the English domestic game and the European scene by storm and money raised from those successes was invested in a stand that had a capacity of 10,000. It was renamed The Brian Clough Stand after his retirement and was re-opened after refurbishment by Clough himself in the mid-1990s. The stand also incorporated 36 executive boxes and a large dining area, which was designed to be the focus of the club's corporate hospitality arrangements. The stand had the word "FOREST" spelt out in white seats against the red seats of the upper tier, the first stand in football known to have used this form of coloured seat identification. The opening of the new stand gave the City Ground a capacity of 35,567, including 15,009 seats, a figure that would remain broadly constant until terrace capacities began to be cut after the Hillsborough disaster in 1989.

=== Taylor Report ===
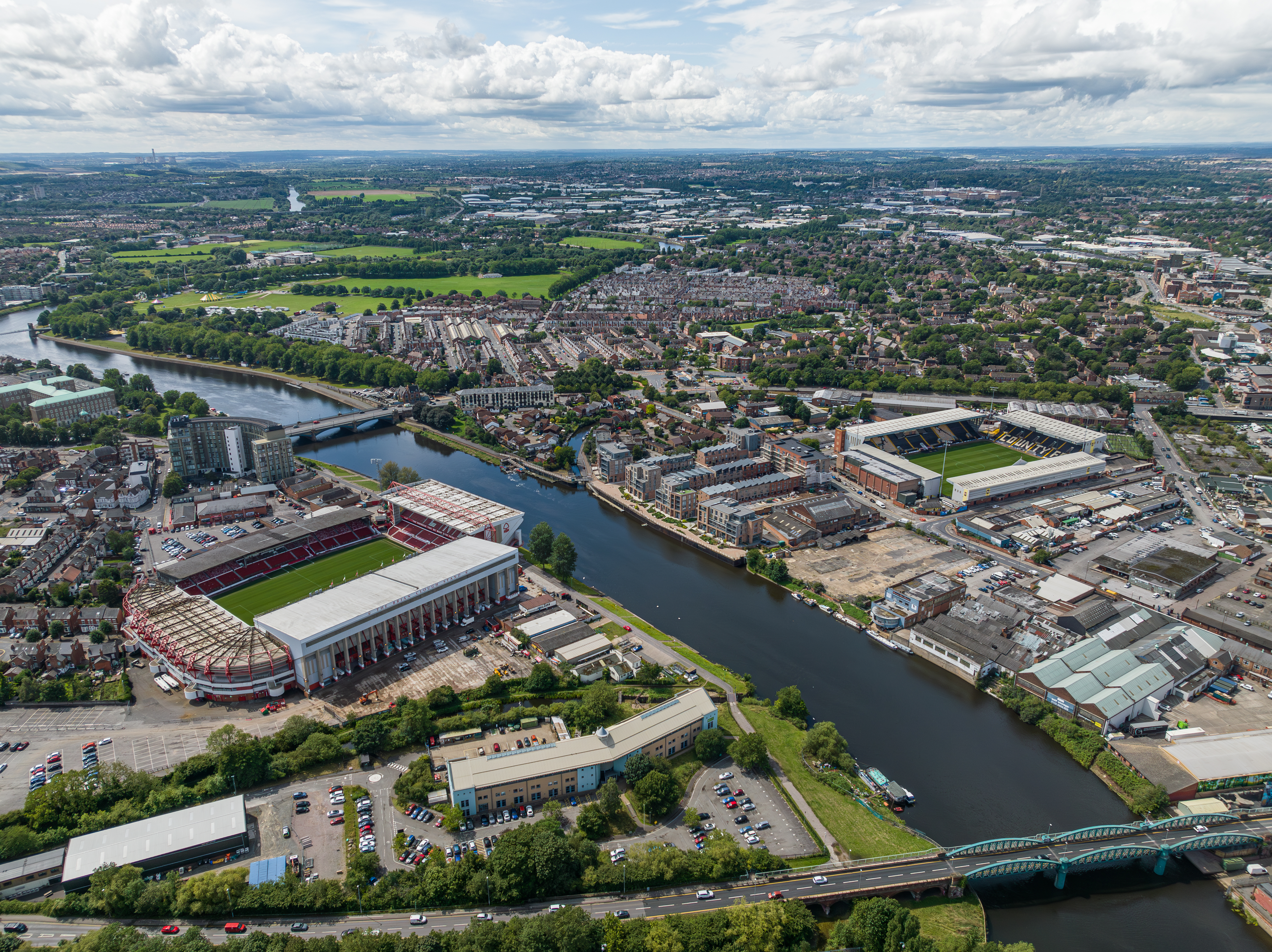
Meadow Lane (right) and the City Ground (left), the two closest grounds in English football.

Nottingham Forest had been the opposing team in the fateful FA Cup semi-final against Liverpool at Hillsborough, Sheffield, on 15 April 1989, in which 97 Liverpool fans were fatally injured in a human crush on the stadium's Leppings Lane terrace. The disaster resulted in the Taylor Report, which ordered that all clubs in the top two divisions of English football should have an all-seater stadium by August 1994. This resulted in the need for more redevelopment and refurbishment at the City Ground.

In 1991, Nottingham City Council proposed to build a 45,000 capacity stadium at a cost of £44m on the site of Wilford Power Station, one mile to the west of the City Ground, to be shared by Forest and Notts County. Although Notts County were keen on the idea, the plan was abandoned after Brian Clough declared "over my dead body" and threatened to resign if the plan was approved. Forest's own plans were to redevelop the two ends of the City Ground into all-seater stands, starting with the Trent End, but this was held up by a dispute with the City Council over the 8m-15m strip at the back of the Trent End that they would need to build over to extend the stand. The club had signed a 50-year lease from the City Council for the eleven acres of the City Ground in 1964 at a rent of £750 a year, but the council demanded a rent of £150,000 a year for the 1,121 square yard "ransom strip" behind the Trent End, leading to accusations that the council were trying to force the club to cooperate with their plans for a new stadium at Wilford. Although a compromise rent of £22,000 per year was agreed, the delay meant that Forest had in the meantime turned their attention to replacing the Colwick Road Terrace at the other end of the ground.

The first major development took place in 1992–93, with the rebuilding of the Bridgford Stand at a cost of £4.6m, of which £1.9m came from a grant from the Football Trust. Work started in April 1992 and when completed the stand had a capacity of 7,710, the lower tier of 5,131 being allocated to away supporters. The unusual shape of the roof was a planning requirement to allow sunlight to reach houses in nearby Colwick Road. The Stand includes accommodation for seventy wheelchair supporters. It also houses a management suite, which includes the public address systems, computerised electronic scoreboard controls and the police matchday operation.

The Trent End was the most recent stand to be rebuilt between 1994 and 1996 – in time for Euro 96, the European Football Championships. The new stand, such a prominent landmark by the River Trent, held 7,338 to take the ground's capacity to 30,576 all-seated. The last day of standing on the Trent End was 8 May 1994, when 27,010 spectators saw Forest celebrate promotion back to the Premier League.

The ground was expanded to 46,000 when Forest returned to the Premier League, however, they were relegated from the Premier League three times between 1993 and 1999. Although they achieved promotion immediately following the first two relegations, it was to be 23 years following their relegation in 1999 before they would return to the Premier League in 2022. During this period, the club even spent three seasons in League One, the third tier of English football.

The City Ground also hosted the Women's FA Cup final for two successive years, in 2007 and 2008. The 2007 final was contested by Arsenal and Charlton Athletic, with the attendance of 24,529 smashing the previous record attendance for the competition of 13,824 for the final between Arsenal and Fulham at Selhurst Park in 2001. In 2008, the attendance record was broken once again when 24,582 spectators saw Arsenal beat Leeds United 4–1.

Aside from football, the stadium has also hosted two other large-scale events. On 28 April 2002, the stadium hosted a semi-final of rugby's Heineken Cup in which Leicester Tigers beat Llanelli Scarlets 13–12. Leicester Tigers once again played at City Ground when they were defeated 19–16 by Racing 92 on 24 April 2016 in the semi-final of the European Rugby Champions Cup. The stadium hosted its first music concert when R.E.M. performed there in front of an audience of 20,000.

=== Proposed relocation ===
In 2007, the club announced plans to build a new stadium with a capacity of up to 50,000 in Clifton on the south-western outskirts of Nottingham, arguing that the cost of expanding the City Ground would be prohibitive, and that with £45m-£50m of funding from the public and private sectors a new ground could be built by 2014. The move was planned to coincide with the extension of the Nottingham Express Transit to the area and the expansion of the nearby A453 link to the M1 motorway, promising a "dramatic new gateway" to the city, including additional housing and commercial development. The plan was opposed by local residents, however, and criticised by fans as an attempt to deflect attention from the fact the club had been relegated to League One. After the developers decided against proceeding, a new proposal was announced in 2008 for a 50,000 seat "super stadium" costing £100m near the National Watersports Centre at Holme Pierrepont, to form part of England's 2018 FIFA World Cup bid. The club argued that the main stand at the City Ground could be developed to provide a capacity of 37,000, but that access problems would mean that the venue would never qualify to hold World Cup or other international matches. The new stadium would have required a new bridge to be built over the River Trent and extensive engineering to overcome the risk from its location on a floodplain, but was abandoned as it was felt it would face significant local opposition.

Further development of the City Ground was ruled out in 2009 by Nottingham City Council, who owned the land the ground was built on, and in September a new plan was unveiled to build a 45,000 seater stadium for the 2018 World Cup, close to the A52 at Gamston, with the club arguing that "exhaustive studies of the existing City Ground had shown it was impossible to transform the ground into a fully compliant FIFA stadium". The capacity of the new stadium was planned to be reduced to 38,000 with the removal of temporary seating after the World Cup. The proposal was hit by opposition from local residents and political wrangling, with Nottinghamshire County Council withdrawing support from the bid shortly before it was submitted, claiming that not enough consideration had been given to redeveloping the City Ground and objecting to the proposal to build 4,000 homes on greenbelt land. FIFA's technical requirements had been the driving force behind the proposal and the failure of England's World Cup bid in 2010 threw new stadium plans into doubt.

After the 2012 takeover, Forest's new owner Fawaz Al-Hasawi announced long-term plans to build a new stadium away from the City Ground, but stated that the short term priority was to renovate and refurbish the existing ground. In December 2012, two new big screens were installed, one between the Trent End and the Brian Clough Stand and the other to the rear of the Lower Bridgford Stand, together with LED advertising boards around the pitch in a project costing more than £1m. In October 2015, the Main Stand was renamed in honour of Brian Clough's assistant manager Peter Taylor. Following issues with the ground's safety certificate, the capacity of the stadium was reduced to 24,357 ahead of the 2016–17 season. By the time of the Hasawis' sale of the club in 2017, the City Ground was criticised by the Nottingham Post for having "started to fall into a state of decay" and being "tired, dishevelled, sad and like nobody really cared any more". Refurbishment work was carried out in the summer of 2017 under new owner Evangelos Marinakis, including improved dressing rooms and new dugouts with cushioned seats, alongside more general maintenance work to the wider stadium. In 2019, the club secured a 250-year extension of their lease on the City Ground from Nottingham City Council, enabling them to move forward with redevelopment plans including the rebuilding of the Peter Taylor Stand, improvements to the Bridgford and Brian Clough Stands, and development of the wider Trentside area. In 2025, owner Evangelos Marinakis proposed re-naming the Bridgford Stand the John Robertson Stand in honour of John Robertson, who died on Christmas Day of that year.

=== Concerts ===
On 22 September 2023, it was announced Take That would perform the first concert at City Ground since 2005 on 26 May 2024. Due to phenomenal demand, tickets sold out within 45 minutes and an extra show was added on 25 May. Over 50,000 people attended the concerts which were part of the band's 2024 This Life on Tour with support from Olly Murs.

== Ground redevelopment ==
On 28 February 2019, the club announced plans to expand the capacity of the ground from 30,455 to about 38,000, by replacing the existing Peter Taylor stand with a new 10,000-seater stand and to provide an additional 3,000 seats in the Bridgford End by 'completing' the dropped southern corner. The vision brought forward was designed by Newark based architectural practice Benoy. Central to the Benoy vision was the replacement of the existing Peter Taylor Stand, and improvements to the Trentside area, the Brian Clough Stand, and the Bridgford Stand.

The new Peter Taylor Stand would have seen the introduction of a museum, a new club shop, executive boxes, and a range of hospitality lounge options and restaurants. The new structure, in combination with additions to the Bridgford End, would have seen the City Ground's capacity become the highest in the East Midlands, reaching 38,000 after completion.

The club was hopeful that building work would commence at the end of the 2019–20 season. However, the redevelopment plans were temporarily put on hold due to the COVID-19 pandemic. On 1 June 2021, Nottingham Forest submitted a revised planning application with residential development plans tweaked to appease planners. After a lengthy delay, on 28 July 2022, resolution to grant planning permission was made by Rushcliffe Borough Council planning committee, however full planning permission was never granted, as all parties concerned with the application did not agree on section 106 terms.

The redevelopment plans once again came under question following a rent-row between the club and the city's council in February 2024, leading the club to state that they could revive plans to move elsewhere unless an agreement was reached. In May 2024, The Athletic reported that club owner Evangelos Marinakis wanted the club to move from the City Ground and that the club were considering moving to a purpose built stadium in Toton, nearly six miles from Nottingham City Centre. In the days following this news, an architect based in Nottingham, Matthew Drewitt, released a high level vision for an all new 65,000 seat stadium on the current City Ground site. The vision aimed to solve Forest's long held ambitions of significantly increasing the stadium's capacity by rotating the pitch such that the main stand would run parallel to the River Trent. The designs included a new club museum, a new pier pontoon for river taxis/floating event spaces and an extended Trentside towpath, which would enable greater fan concourse space over the banks of the River Trent.

In July 2024, the city council eventually agreed to sell the stadium's land to the club almost four months later since the row started. In September 2024, owner Evangelos Marinakis confirmed his intentions to keep Forest at the City Ground, expanding the ground to a capacity of 50,000.

The City Ground has seen significant redevelopment efforts, particularly following Nottingham Forest's return to the Premier League. Much of the stadium has been redecorated with new signs and decorations, enhancing the overall aesthetic and fan experience.

A notable addition is the installation of a Shipping Container Stand in the corner between the Trent End and the Brian Clough Stand. This innovative stand has a capacity of approximately 500 seats. The redevelopment also includes new safe standing areas, high-definition screens, and upgraded hospitality lounges, making the City Ground a modern and vibrant venue for football and other events.

In June 2025, Rushcliffe Borough Council resolved to approve the club's plans for a new Peter Taylor stand and associated residential development. The club confirmed they would be working with partners on next steps, following the appointment of former Foster + Partners architect Konstantinos Chatzimanolis.

On 29 September 2025, Nottingham Forest submitted an EIA Screening Request to Rushcliffe Borough Council, stating their intentions to expand the City Ground up to a capacity of 45,000. The previously submitted planning application which sought to add an extra 5,000 seats to the Peter Taylor Stand will be shelved, and a new proposal brought forward to increase capacity up to 15,000, with an overall height of 58m. In addition, the Trent End will be expanded by up to 5,000 seats by infilling the corners, maintaining its current height. Planning documents revealed that architectural practice KSS had been appointed to carry out design work on behalf of the club, notable for their work on Liverpool’s Anfield Main and Anfield Road End stands, the planned expansion of Leeds United’s Elland Road and Crystal Palace’s new main stand at Selhurst Park.

On 4 November 2025, Nottingham Forest announced plans to increase the capacity of the City Ground to 52,500. At a launch event attended by club chairperson Nicholas Randall and East Midlands mayor Claire Ward, Nottingham Forest confirmed their intention to expand the Peter Taylor stand to 15,000 and increase the Trent End by a further 5,000, including plans to increase the Brian Clough stand by 7,500, bringing total capacity to more than 52,500. Nottingham Forest submitted a planning application to Rushcliffe Borough Council on 16 December 2025, and this was given conditional approval in September 2026, with the main condition being the agreement of a "crowd flow report" identifying a permanent solution for pedestrian access to the stadium without impacting on Trent Bridge traffic; it is likely this will include a new pedestrian bridge over the Trent. In the meantime, enabling works commenced in October 2026 with the demolition of a number of houses on Colwick Road and Rosebery Avenue, while planning permission was granted for a new club shop on Radcliffe Road, enabling the demolition of the current club shop as part of the stadium development.

An outline application was also submitted for the expansion of the Brian Clough stand alongside the main application for the Trent End and Peter Taylor stand. It is understood Nottingham Forest are yet to purchase the freehold to the City Ground site, and this is subject to them gaining planning permission for their projects.

== UEFA Euro 1996 matches ==
The following games were played at the City Ground during the opening phase of the UEFA Euro 96 tournament.

| Date | | Result | | Round |
|---|---|---|---|---|
| 11 June 1996 | Turkey | 0–1 | Croatia | Group D |
| 14 June 1996 | Portugal | 1–0 | Turkey | Group D |
| 19 June 1996 | Croatia | 0–3 | Portugal | Group D |

== Images ==
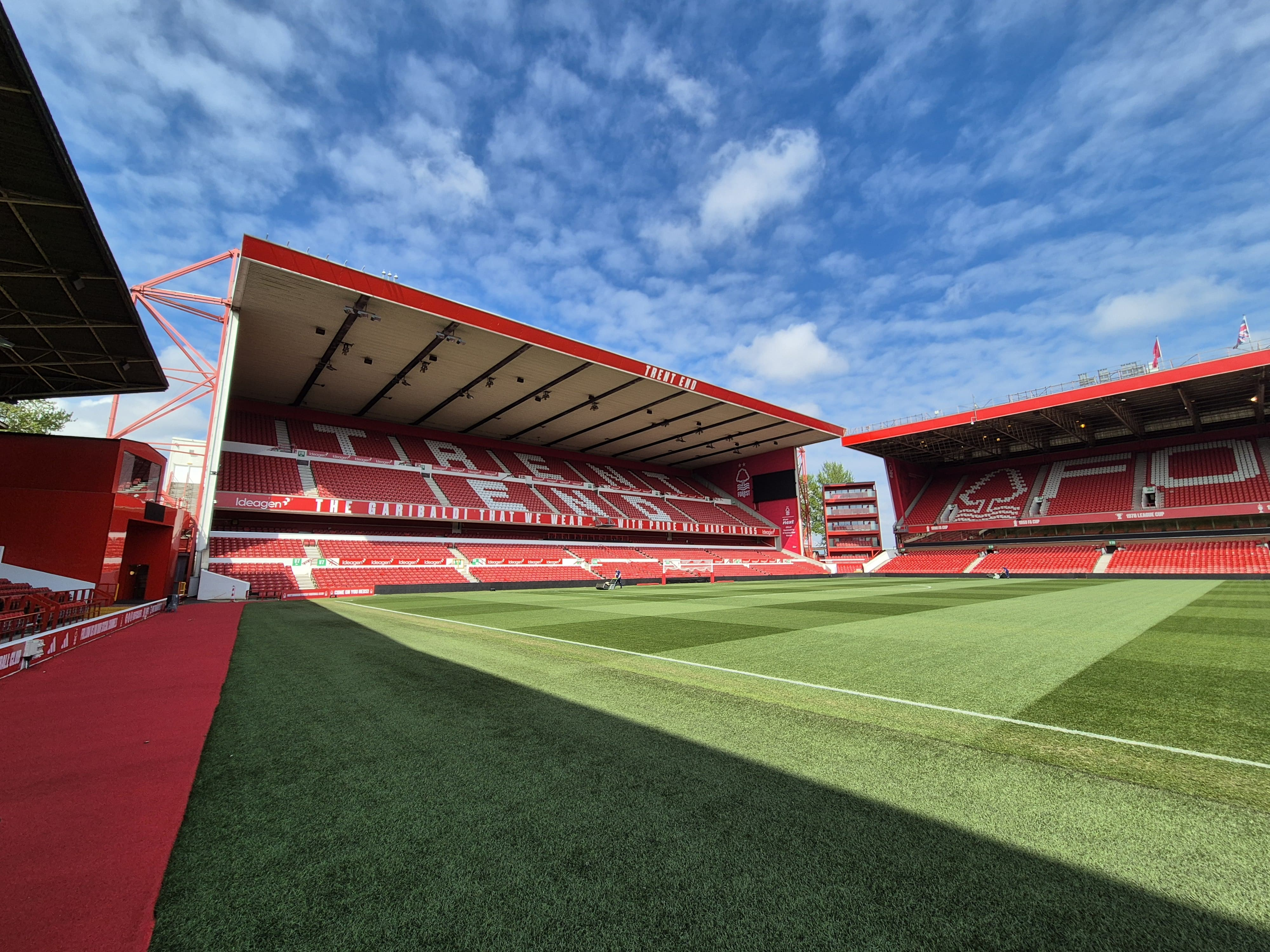
Photo taken from The Peter Taylor Stand showing the Trent End stand of the City Ground in 2025

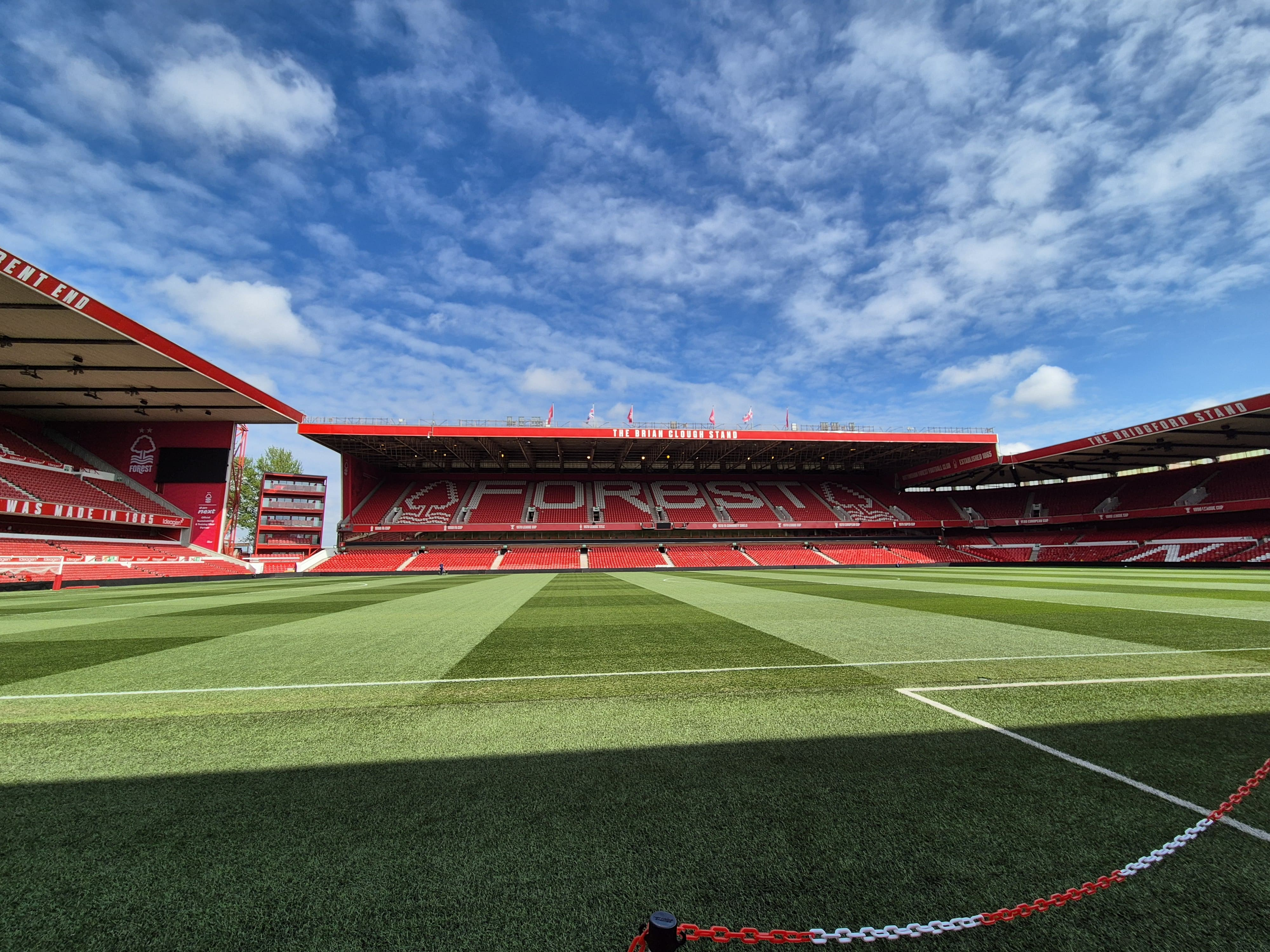
Photo taken from The Peter Taylor Stand showing The Brian Clough Stand of the City Ground in 2025

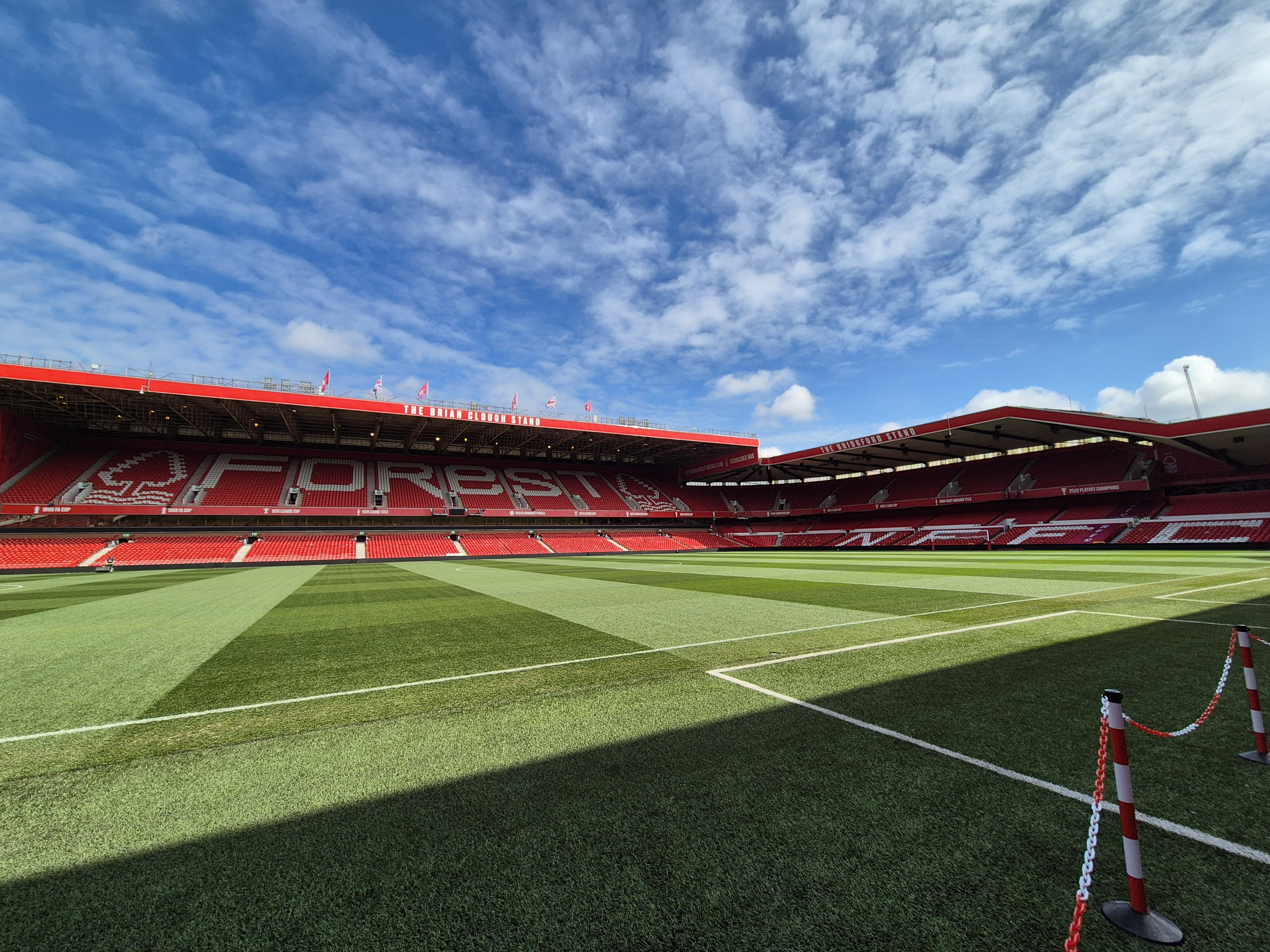
Photo taken from The Peter Taylor Stand showing The Bridgford Stand of the City Ground in 2025

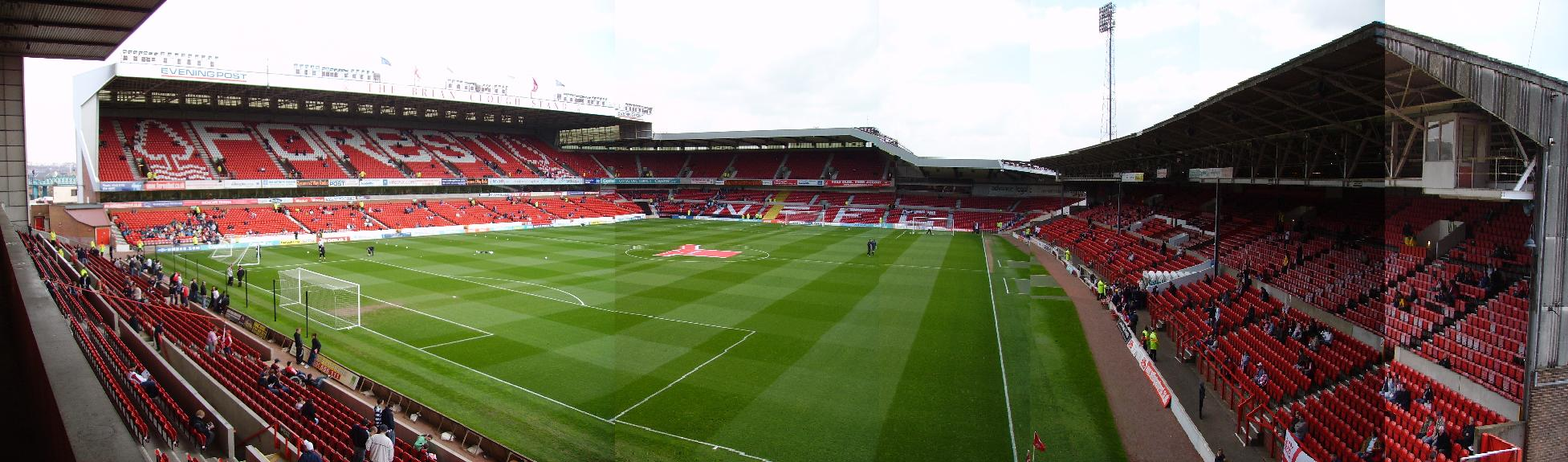
Panorama taken from the Trent End

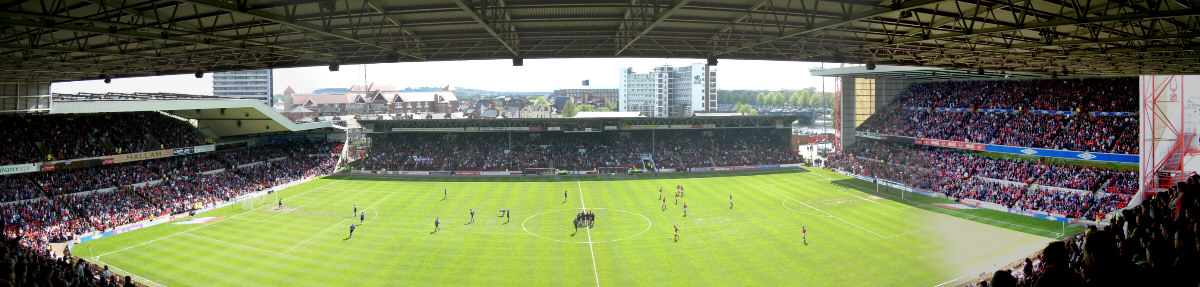
Panorama taken from the Brian Clough Stand looking across at the Peter Taylor Stand, with the Radcliffe Road End of Trent Bridge cricket ground on the left

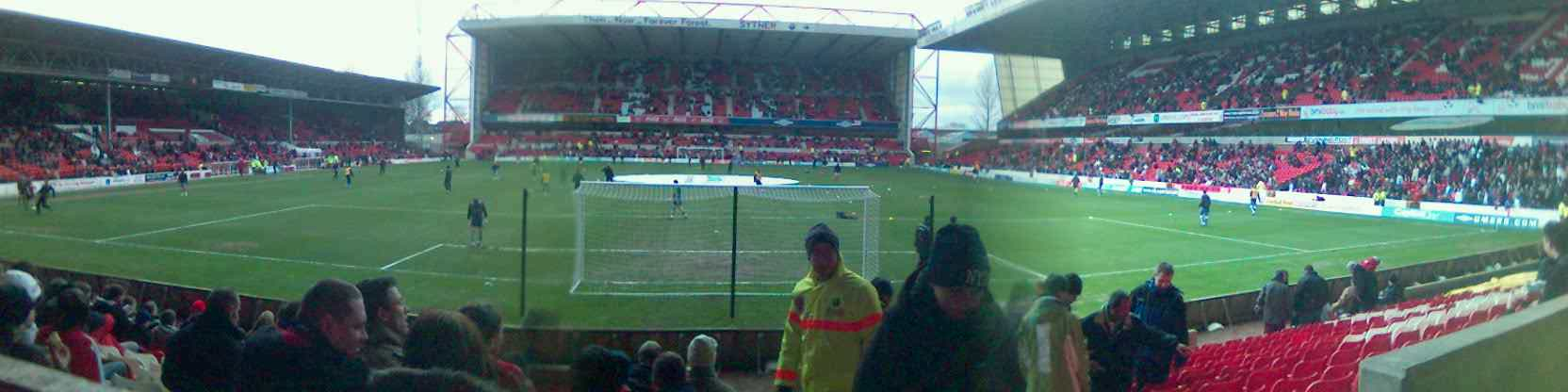
Panorama taken from the Bridgford End Lower Tier (the away end) looking towards the Trent End

== See also ==
- Lists of stadiums
- List of football stadiums in England

== Bibliography ==
- Attaway, Pete (1991). Nottingham Forest: A Complete Record, 1865-1991. Derby: Breedon Books Sport. ISBN 090796995X.
- Dawes, Andrew (2017). The Origins and Development of Association Football in Nottinghamshire c.1860-1915 (PhD). De Montfort University.
- Inglis, Simon (1996). "Nottingham Forest". Football Grounds of Britain. London: HarperCollins. pp. 273–277. ISBN 0002184265.
- "Nottingham Forest and Lenton". Lenton Times. No. 4. Lenton Local History Society. June 1990.
- Mellor, Keith (1986). Forest Road: Pictorial Milestones of the Garibaldi Reds. Nottingham: Temple Printing. ISBN 9781870010009.
- Turner, A. J. (1965). The Hundred Years Story of the Nottingham Forest Football Club: 1865 – 1965. Nottingham: Nottingham Forest Football Club. OCLC 668119479.
- Wright, Don (2015). Forever Forest: The Official 150th Anniversary History of the Original Reds. Stroud: Amberley Publishing. ISBN 9781445661315.
