= Beeston F.C. =

Beeston
- Full name: Beeston Football Club
- Founded: 1873
- Dissolved: 1896
- Ground: Victoria Hotel
- Secretary: Henry Orton
Home colours

Beeston Football Club - also known as Beeston Town - was an association football club from Beeston, then a village near Nottingham, active in the late 19th century.

== History ==
The club claimed a foundation date of 1873, but it had a fitful existence for the 1870s and 1880s, playing mostly friendly matches. The club had a major boost in 1889, when several amateur players seceded from Nottingham Forest after the Reds turned professional. The club duly entered the 1889–90 FA Cup qualifying rounds, its first entry to the competition, but lost 3–2 to Notts Rangers in the second qualifying round; seven of the players were former Forest players.

It also entered the Nottinghamshire Senior Cup in 1889–90, and drew Forest at home in the first round; as Forest had a Football Alliance match at home on the same day, it sent a third XI to the tie, which Beeston won, but in the face of the rival attraction in the town, the crowd was a mere 200. Beeston went all the way to the final, at Forest's Gregory Ground, and won the trophy for the only time, thanks to a 3–1 win over Newark.

Newark complained about biased refereeing, and had a chance for revenge in the 1890–91 FA Cup qualifying rounds as the clubs were drawn together in the second round, Beeston having had a bye. Newark looked as if it had indeed gained a modicum of revenge, reversing the final score on its own patch, but Beeston successfully protested that Newark had fielded an ineligible player, and Beeston was put through to the third round instead. Beeston duly lost 6–1 at Rotherham Town at the next stage, a result which "came as glad tidings to Newark".

Beeston last entered the FA Cup in 1892–93, and scored its only win, beating Gedling Grove 4–1 in the first qualifying round; Beeston had been drawn at home, but its ground was flooded, so it was switched to the Nottingham Town ground, and "no-one attended". In the second round, the club played well in the first half at Kettering, but "fell to pieces" in the second and lost 6–1.

The club never disbanded as such, but petered out, as it did not join a league, which even town rival Beeston St John's managed to do; it was noted in January 1893 that it had not played for 8 weeks, and the blame was put on the accession of Nottingham Forest to the Football League, as that meant local football fans could see League football most weekends.

The club finished the 1894–95 season as runner-up in the Mansfield Charity Cup, going down 3–0 to Mansfield in the final, and also lost in the final (2–1 to Newstead Byron) in 1895–96, but that was the club's only fixture of note in 1896, and it does not seem to have played again.

== Colours ==
The club's colours were a Corinthian white and navy blue, probably referring to a plain jersey.

== Ground ==
The club originally used the cricket ground, next to Beeston railway station, and the Victoria Hotel opposite provided facilities. In 1893 it found a new ground on the Chilwell side of the Midland Railway line.

== Notable players ==
- Walter Luntley (goalkeeper) and George Lutin (centre-forward), brother and brother-in-law respectively of England international Ted Luntley, both of whom left Forest for Beeston in 1889
