= Streat (surname) =

Streat is a surname. Notable people with the surname include:

- Raymond Streat (1897–1979), British cotton industry administrator
- Thelma Johnson Streat (1911–1959), African-American artist, dancer, and educator

== See also ==
- Street (surname)
