= J. T. C. Hopkins =

American politician and lawyer (1843–1922)

Member of the Maryland House of Delegates from the Harford County district
- In office 1870–1870 Serving with William M. Ady, William Baldwin, Joseph M. Streett

Personal details
- Born: John Thomas Chew Hopkins; March 20, 1843
- Died: September 19, 1922 (aged 79) Bel Air, Maryland, U.S.
- Resting place: Darlington Cemetery; Darlington, Maryland, U.S.
- Party: Democratic
- Spouse: Amanda E. Wylie (m. 1879; died 1916)
- Children: 8
- Parent: Thomas Chew Hopkins (father)
- Education: St. John's College
- Occupation: Politician; lawyer; bank president

John Thomas Chew Hopkins (March 20, 1843 – September 19, 1922) was an American politician and lawyer from Maryland. He served as a member of the Maryland House of Delegates, representing Harford County in 1870.

== Early life ==
John Thomas Chew Hopkins was born March 20, 1843, to Priscilla (née Worthington) and Thomas Chew Hopkins. He graduated from St. John's College in Annapolis, Maryland. He read law under Stevenson Archer and was admitted to the bar in 1865.

== Career ==
Hopkins was a Democrat. He served as a member of the Maryland House of Delegates, representing Harford County in 1870. He served as the state's attorney of Harford County from 1871 to 1879.

Hopkins was one of the founders and the first president of the Second National Bank of Bel Air. He served as deputy collector at the Port of Baltimore during President Grover Cleveland's second administration.

Hopkins practiced law in Bel Air.

== Personal life ==
Hopkins married Amande E. Wylie of South Carolina on April 30, 1879, at Poplar Grove in Bel Air. They had five daughters and three sons, Mrs. Clifford Dawson Rosan, Mrs. J. Stephenson Hopkins, Mary Alden, J. Thomas C. Jr., W. Wylie, W. Worthington, Ellen H. and Theresa M. His wife died in 1916.

Hopkins died on September 19, 1922, at the age of 79, at his home in Bel Air. He was buried at Darlington Cemetery.
