= Gladden Farm =

- U.S. National Register of Historic Places
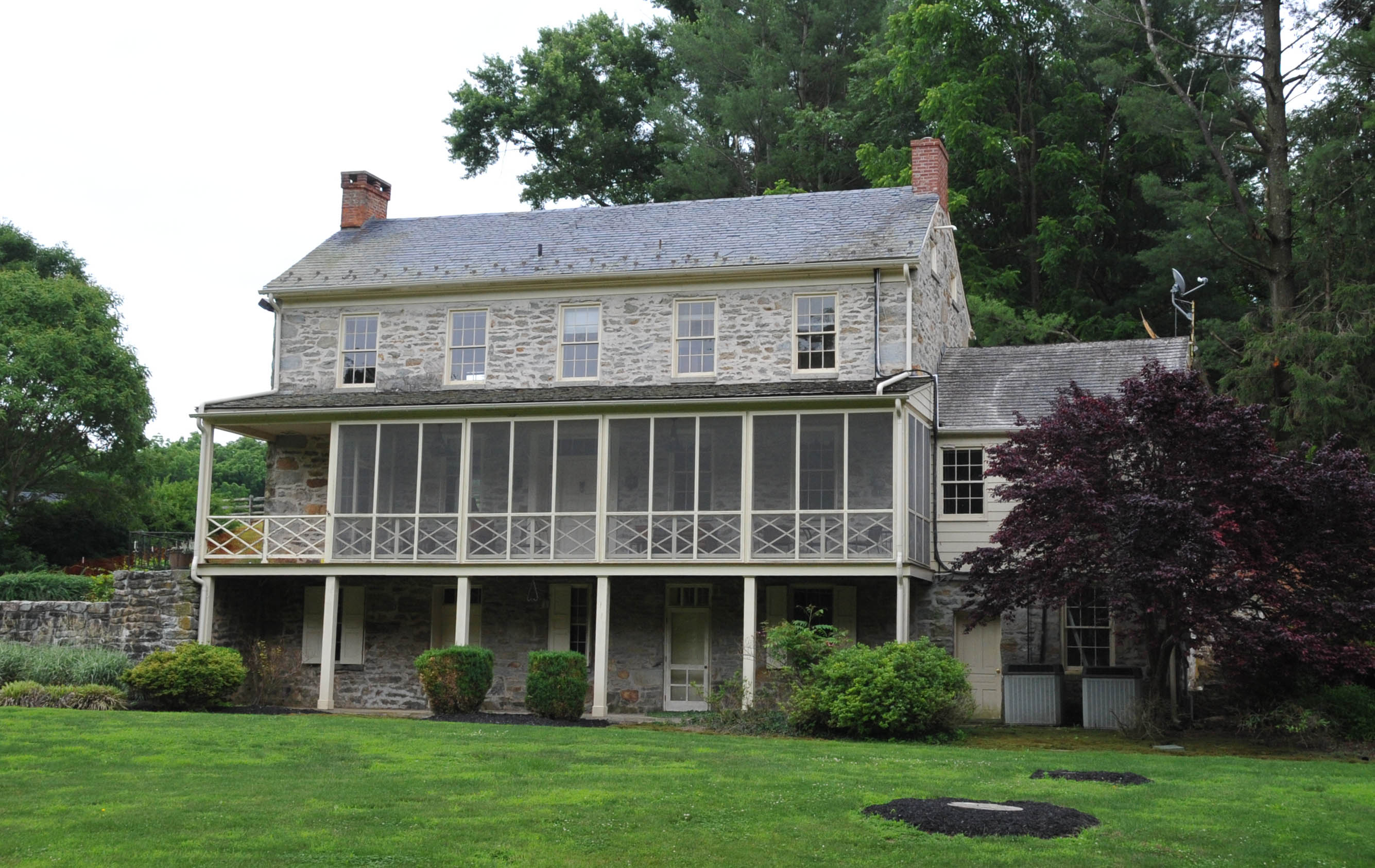
- Gladden Farm in 2007

- Location within Maryland Location within the United States
- Location: 3881 Rocks Station Road, Street, Maryland
- Coordinates: 39°38′27″N 76°24′22″W
- Area: 114.8 acres (46.5 ha)
- Built: 1800
- Architectural style: Federal
- NRHP reference No.: 93000444
- Added to NRHP: May 28, 1993

Gladden Farm, also known as Gladden-Roming Stone House, is a historic home and farm complex located in Street, Maryland. The complex includes three historically significant structures: a large five-bay rubblestone bank house with Federal detailing, a one-story rubblestone spring house, and a one-story board-and-batten frame shop.

The first two structures were built around 1820, the latter from the mid-19th century. Some interior details were installed around 1945 from a demolished house on Franklin Street in Baltimore, including a mantel, built-in cabinets, and bookcases. The main room's north wall is paneled with English oak removed from another demolished Baltimore dwelling. The home is named for the locally prominent Gladden family, who were leading and innovative farmers, who saw to it that the Maryland and Pennsylvania Railroad was built through this party of the county, and established a station stop near their farm at The Rocks.

The farm was listed on the National Register of Historic Places in 1993.
