= David Riley (politician) =

American politician (died 1901)

Member of the Maryland House of Delegates from the Harford County district
- In office 1872–1874 Serving with William Baldwin, Joseph M. Streett, Nathan Grafton, Otho S. Lee

Personal details
- Died: July 7, 1901 (aged 64) Wilmington, Delaware
- Resting place: Dublin Methodist Episcopal Church; Dublin, Maryland, U.S.
- Party: Democratic
- Children: 7
- Education: University of Maryland
- Occupation: Politician; physician

David Riley (died July 7, 1901) was an American politician and physician from Maryland. He served as a member of the Maryland House of Delegates, representing Harford County from 1872 to 1874.

== Early life ==
David Riley was born to Susanna Riley. He graduated from the University of Maryland.

== Career ==
Riley was a Democrat. He served as a member of the Maryland House of Delegates, representing Harford County from 1872 to 1874. Riley ran for the Democratic nomination for state delegate in the 1879 election, but lost.

In 1880, Riley was appointed as clerk of the committee on claims. Riley was a delegate to the Maryland State Democratic Convention in 1887.

Riley practiced medicine in Dublin, Maryland, for 40 years. Riley was elected as president of the Harford County Medical Society in 1881. He was appointed as a vaccine physician in his district in 1882.

In 1883-1884 and from 1887 to 1890 and 1891 to 1898, Riley was a trustee of Dublin School No. 13.

== Personal life ==
Riley married and had seven children, Mrs. William Clement, Ella May (married David G. Clement), Mrs. J. M. C. Merrick, Annie, H. S., William T. and F. P. He lived in Dublin.

Riley died following treatment on July 7, 1901, at the age of 64, at Farmhurst Hospital in Wilmington, Delaware. He was interred at Dublin Methodist Episcopal Church in Dublin.
