= Beeston St John's F.C. =

Beeston St John's
- Full name: Beeston St John's Football Club
- Nicknames: the Saints, the Johnians
- Founded: 1886
- Dissolved: 1895
- Ground: Padgers Road
- Secretary: E. Wright
Home colours

Beeston St John's F.C. was an association football club from Nottingham, active in the late 19th century.

== History ==
The first record of the club is from 1886, when it entered the Nottinghamshire Church Football Association Cup. The club however had greater ambitions, and entered the Nottingham Express Challenge Cup for more senior clubs that year, although it lost 7–0 in the first round to Kimberley Town.

The club first made its mark by beating Loughborough Town in a friendly at the end of 1887 - Beeston had turned up to Loughborough to play the second XI, but, after the Town first XI was disappointed in its fixture, offered to play the senior side instead. It finished the season by winning the Church Cup with a 1–0 win over Mapperley, in front of 1,200 on the Castle Ground in Nottingham, albeit its opponent was handicapped by losing a man to a broken leg in the first half.

The club therefore entered the FA Cup for 1888–89, although that season qualifying rounds had been brought in. It won its first tie, 2–0 at home to Notts Olympic; in the second qualifying round, the club was drawn away to Notts County. As County also had a scheduled Football League match against Burnley on the same day, County hosted the matches as a double header, and fielded a reserve XI against St Johns - which was still good enough to win 4–2.

The turning professional of Nottingham Forest indirectly prevented the club from proceeding further. A number of the Forest players left to join the amateur side Beeston F.C., and both clubs entered the 1889–90 FA Cup qualifying rounds. Both lost at the first time of asking (St John's to Jardines at home) and St John's did not enter again.

The club played in the Notts League from 1889–90 until 1894–95, but withdrew from the competition in the middle of the latter season, having only won one match in 13; its final recorded match was a 10–2 defeat at Hucknall St John's in December 1894, with two Beeston players having to retire after their boots fell apart. The club disbanded before the 1895–96 season.

== Colours ==
The club wore red jerseys.

== Ground ==
The club's ground was at Padgers Road, near the Humber Limited works,

== Notable players ==
- Harry Walkerdine, who was made captain of the club in 1889 after a successful first season, but was poached by Notts County after one further match.
