= Nathan Grafton =

American politician and manufacturer (1826–1915)

Member of the Maryland House of Delegates from the Harford County district
- In office 1874–1874 Serving with Otho S. Lee and David Riley

Personal details
- Born: 1826 Forest Hill, Maryland, U.S.
- Died: July 24, 1915 (aged 88–89) Forest Hill, Maryland, U.S.
- Resting place: Old Baptist Cemetery; Jarrettsville, Maryland, U.S.
- Party: Democratic
- Spouse: Barbara Hartman
- Children: 4
- Occupation: Politician; manufacturer

Nathan Grafton (1826 – July 24, 1915) was an American politician and manufacturer from Maryland. He served as a member of the Maryland House of Delegates, representing Harford County in 1874.

== Early life ==
Nathan Grafton was born near Forest Hill, Maryland, in 1826. His brother William was a pastor at the Old Style Baptist Church.

== Career ==
Grafton started a trade as a wheelwright and carriage builder. He had a carriage factory. He retired around 1890 and turned the business over to his sons.

Grafton was a Democrat. He served as a member of the Maryland House of Delegates, representing Harford County in 1874.

Grafton was one of the first directors of the Harford Fair Association in the 1870s. He was an original charter member of the Harford National Bank and served as a trustee of the Forest Hill School.

== Personal life ==
Grafton married Barbara Hartman, aunt of state's attorney George Hartman. Grafton had one daughter and three sons, Mary, Jacob, Durand and William. Grafton was a member of the Old Style Baptist Church.

Grafton died on July 24, 1915, at his home near Forest Hill. He was buried at the Old Baptist Cemetery in Jarrettsville.
