= William M. Ady =

American politician (c. 1810 – 1872)

Member of the Maryland House of Delegates from the Harford County district
- In office 1870–1870 Serving with William Baldwin, J. T. C. Hopkins, Joseph M. Streett

Personal details
- Born: c. 1810
- Died: February 25, 1872 (aged 62)
- Resting place: St. Ignatius Cemetery; Harford County, Maryland, U.S.
- Party: Democratic
- Spouse: Laura G. Eicheleberger (m. 1858)
- Occupation: Politician

William M. Ady (c. 1810 – February 25, 1872) was an American politician from Maryland. He served as a member of the Maryland House of Delegates, representing Harford County in 1870.

== Career ==
Ady was a Democrat. He served as a member of the Maryland House of Delegates, representing Harford County in 1870. Ady ran for Harford County Commissioner in the election of 1873, but lost.

In 1867, Ady sold between 300 and 400 acres of land called "Mine Old Fields" and mining rights to "Old Ridge".

== Personal life ==
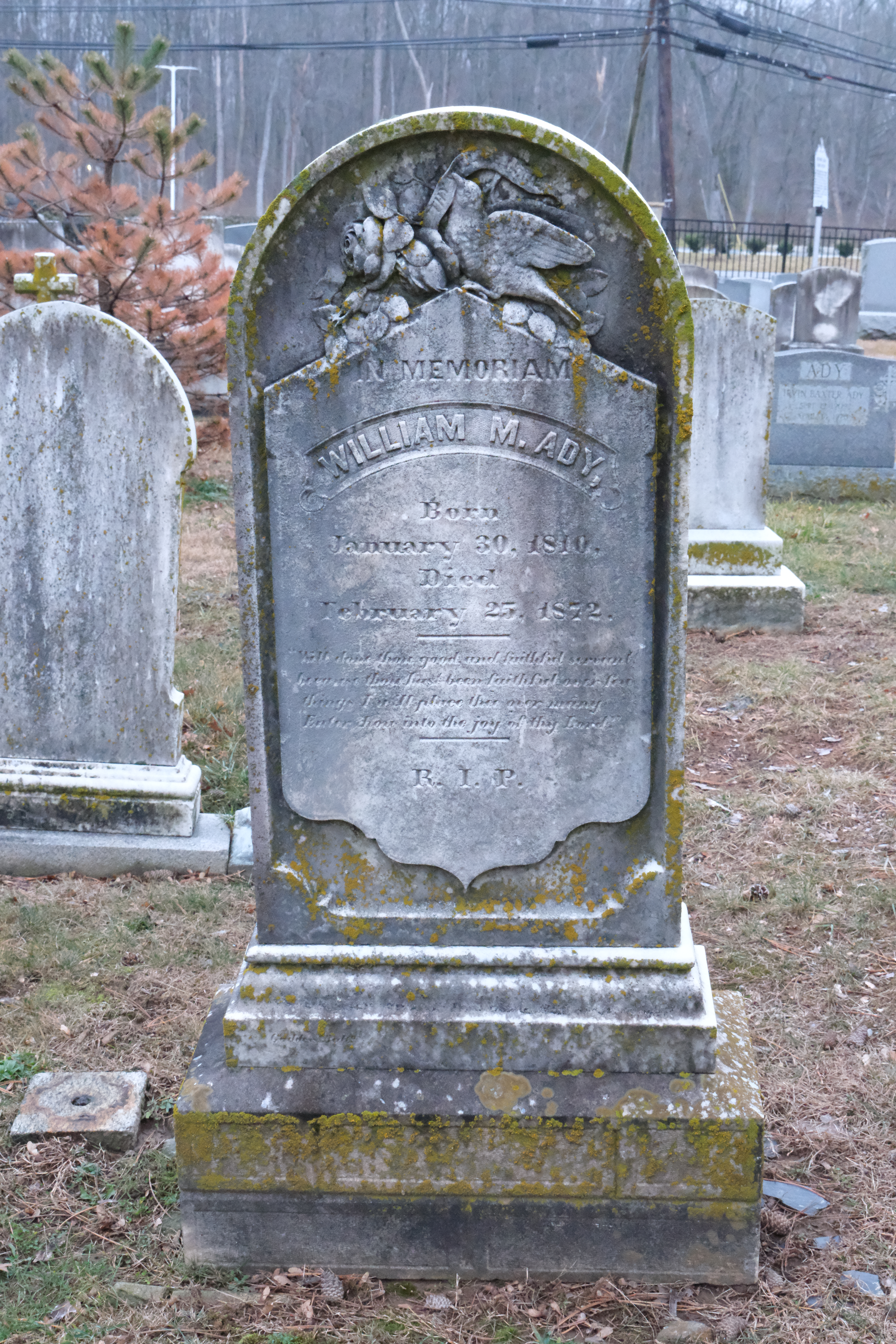
Grave of Ady at Saint Ignatius Cemetery

Ady married Laura G. Eicheleberger on October 19, 1858.

Ady died of pneumonia on February 25, 1872, at the age of 62. He was buried at St. Ignatius Cemetery.
