= William Baldwin (Maryland politician) =

American politician (died 1895)

Member of the Maryland House of Delegates from the Harford County district
- In office 1870–1872 Serving with William M. Ady, J. T. C. Hopkins, Joseph M. Streett, David Riley

Personal details
- Born: Harford County, Maryland, U.S.
- Died: June 22, 1895 (aged 79) Upper Cross Roads, Harford County, Maryland, U.S.
- Party: Democratic
- Spouse: Miss Powell
- Children: 1
- Occupation: Politician

William Baldwin (died June 22, 1895) was an American politician from Maryland. He was a member of the Maryland House of Delegates, representing Harford County from 1870 to 1872.

== Early life ==
Baldwin was born in Harford County, Maryland.

== Career ==
Baldwin was a Democrat. He was a member of the Maryland House of Delegates, representing Harford County from 1870 to 1872.

Baldwin was president of the Harford Agricultural Association for five years. He was a director of the Harford Mutual Fire Insurance Company.

== Personal life ==
Baldwin married Miss Powell. She died around 1881. They had one son, Silas.

Baldwin died on June 22, 1895, at the age of 79, at Upper Cross Roads in Harford County.
