= Otho S. Lee =

American politician and lawyer (1840–1918)

Member of the Maryland House of Delegates from the Harford County district
- In office 1874–1874 Serving with Nathan Grafton and David Riley

Personal details
- Born: Otho Scott Lee; December 6, 1840 near Bel Air, Maryland, U.S.
- Died: August 28, 1918 (aged 77) Bel Air, Maryland, U.S.
- Resting place: Rock Spring Cemetery
- Party: Democratic
- Spouse(s): Sarah B. Griffith (m. 1867; died 1898) Helen A. Bradshaw (m. 1904)
- Children: 12, including John L. G.
- Occupation: Politician; lawyer

Otho Scott Lee (December 6, 1840 – August 28, 1918) was an American politician and lawyer from Maryland. He served as a member of the Maryland House of Delegates, representing Harford County in 1874.

== Early life ==
Otho Scott Lee was born on December 6, 1840, near Bel Air, Maryland, to Hannah (née Bryarly) and Richard Dallam Lee. His father died when Lee was one year old. His grandfather Parker Hall Lee was a member of the Continental Army during the Revolutionary War. At the age of 17, Lee moved to Bel Air and worked as a store clerk. He was educated at Bel Air Academy. He then became a law student until the Civil War interrupted his studies. After the war, he studied law under Henry W. Archer. He was admitted to the bar in November 1865.

== Career ==
Lee joined the Confederate States Army at the outbreak of the Civil War. He served under Major Johnson and General Fitzhugh Lee in J.E.B. Stuart's horse artillery. He was appointed a sergeant-major of artillery towards the end of the war. He served as captain of two companies of the state militia.

After the war, Lee worked as a lawyer in Bel Air. He worked as a chancery starting in 1867.

Lee was a Democrat. He served as a member of the Maryland House of Delegates, representing Harford County in 1874. He served as a colonel on the staff of Maryland governor John Lee Carroll starting in 1876. He served as counsel to the Harford County school commissioners from 1881 to 1916.

Lee served as the first president of the Bel Air Water and Light Company, The Permanent Building Association and the Farmers and Merchants Bank.

== Personal life ==
Lee married Sarah (or Sallie) B. Griffith, daughter of John L. Griffith, in 1867. They had ten children, Alice (Mrs. John Scott Parker), Hannah B., Helen M., Elizabeth Dallam, Cassandra, Margaret B., John L. G., Otho Scott, Robert B. and Henry W. Archer. His wife died in 1898. Lee married Helen A. Bradshaw in 1904. They had two children, Margaret and Robert. His son John L. G. Lee was a member of the Maryland House of Delegates. One of his daughters married Henry W. Archer Jr.

Lee died on August 28, 1918, at his home on Main Street in Bel Air. He was buried at Rock Spring Cemetery.
