= George Streets =

English footballer (1893–1958)

Personal information
- Full name: George Henry Streets
- Date of birth: 5 April 1893
- Place of birth: Nottingham, England
- Date of death: 1958 (aged 64–65)
- Position: Goalkeeper

Senior career*
Years	Team	Apps	(Gls)
1910–1911	Nottingham St Margaret's		
1911–1912	Raleigh Athletic		
1912–1913	Mansfield Mechanics		
1913–1914	The Wednesday	2	(0)
1919–1928	Notts County	133	(0)
1928–1929	Boston Town		
1929–1930	Newark Town		
Total		135	(0)
- * Club domestic league appearances and goals

George Henry Streets (5 April 1893 – 1958) was an English footballer who played in the Football League for Notts County and The Wednesday.
