= 1897–98 FA Cup =

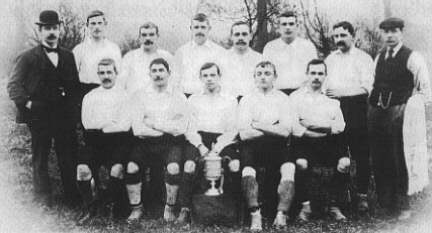
- The Nottingham Forest following the final

Tournament details
- Country: England; Wales

Final positions
- Champions: Nottingham Forest (1st title)
- Runners-up: Derby County

The 1897–98 FA Cup was the 27th season of the world's oldest association football competition, the Football Association Challenge Cup (more usually known as the FA Cup). The cup was won by Nottingham Forest, who defeated Derby County 3–1 in the final of the competition, played at Crystal Palace in London.

Matches were scheduled to be played at the stadium of the team named first on the date specified for each round, which was always a Saturday. If scores were level after 90 minutes had been played, a replay would take place at the stadium of the second-named team later the same week.

If the replayed match was drawn further replays would be held at neutral venues until a winner was determined. If scores were level after 90 minutes had been played in a replay, a 30-minute period of extra time would be played.

== Calendar ==
The format of the FA Cup for the season had a preliminary round, five qualifying rounds, three proper rounds, and the semi-finals and final.

Round	Date
Preliminary round	Saturday 18 September 1897
First round qualifying	Saturday 25 September 1897
Second round qualifying	Saturday 16 October 1897
Third round qualifying	Saturday 30 October 1897
Fourth round qualifying	Saturday 20 November 1897
Fifth round Qualifying	Saturday 11 December 1898
First round proper	Saturday 29 January 1898
Second round proper	Saturday 12 February 1898
Third round proper	Saturday 26 February 1898
Semi-finals	Saturday 19 March 1898
Final	Saturday 16 April 1898

== Qualifying rounds ==
The 16 First Division sides were given byes to the first round, as were Newton Heath, Burnley, Leicester Fosse, Grimsby Town, Walsall and Manchester City from the Second Division. The other Second Division sides were entered into the third qualifying round. Of those sides, only Newcastle United, Woolwich Arsenal, Luton Town and Gainsborough Trinity qualified to the FA Cup proper. Non-league sides Wigan County, Burslem Port Vale, New Brighton Tower, Long Eaton Rangers, Hucknall St John's and Southampton also qualified.

Wigan County was the first of three clubs from the Lancastrian rugby league stronghold to qualify for the first round of the FA Cup. It would be another 25 years before successor club Wigan Borough emulated this achievement and a further 90 years after that until Wigan Athletic held up the trophy as Cup champions. New Brighton Tower and Hucknall St John's were also appearing at this stage for the first time while Long Eaton Rangers, formerly one of the strongest non-league clubs in England, were appearing for the final time before being wound up at the end of the following season.

== First round proper ==
The first round proper contained sixteen ties between 32 teams. The matches were played on Saturday, 29 January 1898. One match was drawn, with the replay taking place in the following midweek fixture.

Tie no	Home team	Score	Away team	Date
1	Burnley	3–1	Woolwich Arsenal	29 January 1898
2	Bury	1–2	Stoke	29 January 1898
3	Liverpool	2–0	Hucknall St Johns	29 January 1898
4	Preston North End	1–2	Newcastle United	29 January 1898
5	Southampton	2–1	Leicester Fosse	29 January 1898
6	Notts County	0–1	Wolverhampton Wanderers	29 January 1898
7	Nottingham Forest	4–0	Grimsby Town	29 January 1898
8	Long Eaton Rangers	0–1	Gainsborough Trinity	29 January 1898
9	West Bromwich Albion	2–0	New Brighton Tower	29 January 1898
10	Sunderland	0–1	The Wednesday	29 January 1898
11	Derby County	1–0	Aston Villa	29 January 1898
12	Luton Town	0–1	Bolton Wanderers	29 January 1898
13	Everton	1–0	Blackburn Rovers	29 January 1898
14	Newton Heath	1–0	Walsall	29 January 1898
15	Sheffield United	1–1	Burslem Port Vale	29 January 1898
Replay	Burslem Port Vale	2–1	Sheffield United	2 February 1898
16	Manchester City	1–0	Wigan County	29 January 1898

== Second round proper ==
The eight Second Round matches were scheduled for Saturday, 12 February 1898. There were two replays, played in the following midweek fixture.

Tie no	Home team	Score	Away team	Date
1	Burnley	3–0	Burslem Port Vale	12 February 1898
2	Southampton	1–0	Newcastle United	12 February 1898
3	Stoke	0–0	Everton	12 February 1898
Replay	Everton	5–1	Stoke	17 February 1898
4	Nottingham Forest	4–0	Gainsborough Trinity	12 February 1898
5	Bolton Wanderers	1–0	Manchester City	12 February 1898
6	Wolverhampton Wanderers	0–1	Derby County	12 February 1898
7	West Bromwich Albion	1–0	The Wednesday	12 February 1898
8	Newton Heath	0–0	Liverpool	12 February 1898
Replay	Liverpool	2–1	Newton Heath	16 February 1898

== Third round proper ==
The four Third Round matches were scheduled for Saturday, 26 February 1898. There were two replays, played in the following midweek fixture.

Tie no	Home team	Score	Away team	Date
1	Burnley	1–3	Everton	26 February 1898
2	Bolton Wanderers	0–0	Southampton	26 February 1898
Replay	Southampton	4–0	Bolton Wanderers	2 March 1898
3	West Bromwich Albion	2–3	Nottingham Forest	26 February 1898
4	Derby County	1–1	Liverpool	26 February 1898
Replay	Liverpool	1–5	Derby County	2 March 1898

== Semi-finals ==
The semi-final matches were both played on Saturday, 19 March 1898. The Nottingham Forest–Southampton match went to a replay, played the following Wednesday, when Nottingham Forest managed a 2–0 win. They went on to meet Derby County in the final at Crystal Palace.

19 March 1898

Derby County	3–1	Everton

Molineux, Wolverhampton

19 March 1898

Nottingham Forest	1–1	Southampton

Bramall Lane, Sheffield

Replay

24 March 1898

Nottingham Forest	2–0	Southampton

Crystal Palace, London

== Final ==
The final took place on Saturday, 16 April 1898 at Crystal Palace. Just over 62,000 supporters attended the match. Arthur Capes opened the scoring for Nottingham Forest after 19 minutes. Forest's lead was maintained for only twelve minutes before Derby County equalised, through a goal from Steve Bloomer. Capes hit his second just before half-time, and Forest preserved the lead until the 86th minute, when McPherson scored a third Forest goal, to hand them their first ever FA Cup Victory.

=== Match details ===
16 April 1898
15:00 GMT

Nottingham Forest	3–1	Derby County
Capes 19' 42'; McPherson 86'		Bloomer 31'

Crystal Palace, London
Attendance: 62,017
Referee: J. Lewis

Nottingham Forest	Derby County

== See also ==
- FA Cup Final Results 1872–
