= Parkside Ground =

Football ground in Nottingham, England

- Interactive map of Parkside Ground
- Location: Lenton, Nottingham, England
- Coordinates: 52.953242°N 1.172901°W
- Surface: Grass

Construction
- Opened: 22 September 1883
- Closed: 1885

Tenant
- Nottingham Forest

The Parkside Ground was a football ground in Nottingham in England. It was the home ground of Nottingham Forest between 1883 and 1885.

Forest were forced to leave Trent Bridge cricket ground in 1883 when Notts County replaced them there and they found a field in Lenton Sands to play on at short notice. The new pitch at Parkside had a slope and was uneven, which contrasted with their previous pitch at Trent Bridge.

Forest's first game there was a 3–2 victory on 22 September 1883 against Small Heath Alliance (who were to become Birmingham City) watched by 3000 people. Crowds in general though were small at Parkside with one game attracting only 150 spectators. The club left Parkside at the end of the 1884/85 season to move to the Gregory Ground.
