= Harry Streett Baldwin =

American politician (1894 – 1952)

Member of the U.S. House of Representatives from Maryland's 2nd district
- In office January 3, 1943 – January 3, 1947
- Preceded by: William Purington Cole Jr.
- Succeeded by: Hugh A. Meade

Member of the Maryland House of Delegates from the 11th District
- In office 1931–1935

Personal details
- Born: August 21, 1894 Baldwin, Maryland, U.S.
- Died: October 19, 1952 (aged 58) Baltimore, Maryland, U.S.
- Resting place: Chestnut Grove Cemetery
- Party: Democratic
- Spouse: Mary Virginia Smith (m. 1916)
- Children: 5
- Education: Maryland Agricultural College
- Occupation: Politician; farmer

Harry Streett Baldwin (August 21, 1894 – October 19, 1952) was a U.S. Congressman who represented the second congressional district of Maryland from 1943 to 1947.

== Early life ==
Harry Streett Baldwin was born on August 21, 1894, at the family farm in Baldwin, Baltimore County, Maryland. His father was a farmer and a canner. He attended a one-room schoolhouse. Baldwin graduated from Towson High School in 1912. He attended the Maryland Agricultural College, but left school after his father died from an accident at the cannery.

He was a descendant of Lieutenant Colonel John Streett.

== Career ==
Baldwin ran dairy farms for seven years before turning to truck farming. He then specialized in farming green beans. He turned to politics after getting involved locally in the 1928 presidential campaign of Al Smith, and the local Democratic headquarters considering him as a candidate for the Maryland House of Delegates.

He represented Baltimore County's 11th district in the Maryland House of Delegates from 1931 to 1935. Baldwin served on Baltimore County's Board of County Commissioners from 1934 to 1942. He led a reform drive to modernize the police department, fire, sewage, garbage disposal, and purchasing operations in the county. Opposition in the board to his reform plan led him to run for president of the board in 1938. His campaign was successful and he served as president from 1938 to 1942.

Baldwin was elected as a Democrat to the Seventy-eighth and 79th United States Congress, serving from January 3, 1943, to January 3, 1947. He was not a candidate for renomination in 1946, but was an unsuccessful Democratic candidate for the Maryland gubernatorial nomination against Preston Lane and Millard Tawes in the 1946 election. After his tenure in Congress, he resumed agricultural pursuits, and was again elected to the board of county commissioners in 1950 and was serving as chairman at the time of death.

== Personal life ==
Baldwin married Mary Virginia Smith of Sunnybrook, Maryland in 1916. They had four sons and one daughter:

- Harry Wallace Baldwin - fighter pilot and Lieutenant, shot down during the Tunisian campaign
- John Streett Baldwin - died in New Mexico during a test flight of a B-29
- Maurice W. Baldwin
- William S. Baldwin
- Mrs. Robert H. Price

== Death ==
Baldwin suffered an intracerebral hemorrhage on October 9, 1952, at his home in Hydes. He died shortly after on October 19, 1952, at Union Memorial Hospital in Baltimore. He is interred in Chestnut Grove Cemetery of Jacksonville, Maryland.

U.S. House of Representatives
Preceded by William Purington Cole Jr.	U.S. Congressman from the 2nd district of Maryland; 1943–1947	Succeeded by Hugh A. Meade
