= Col. John Streett House =

Historic house in Maryland, United States

- U.S. National Register of Historic Places
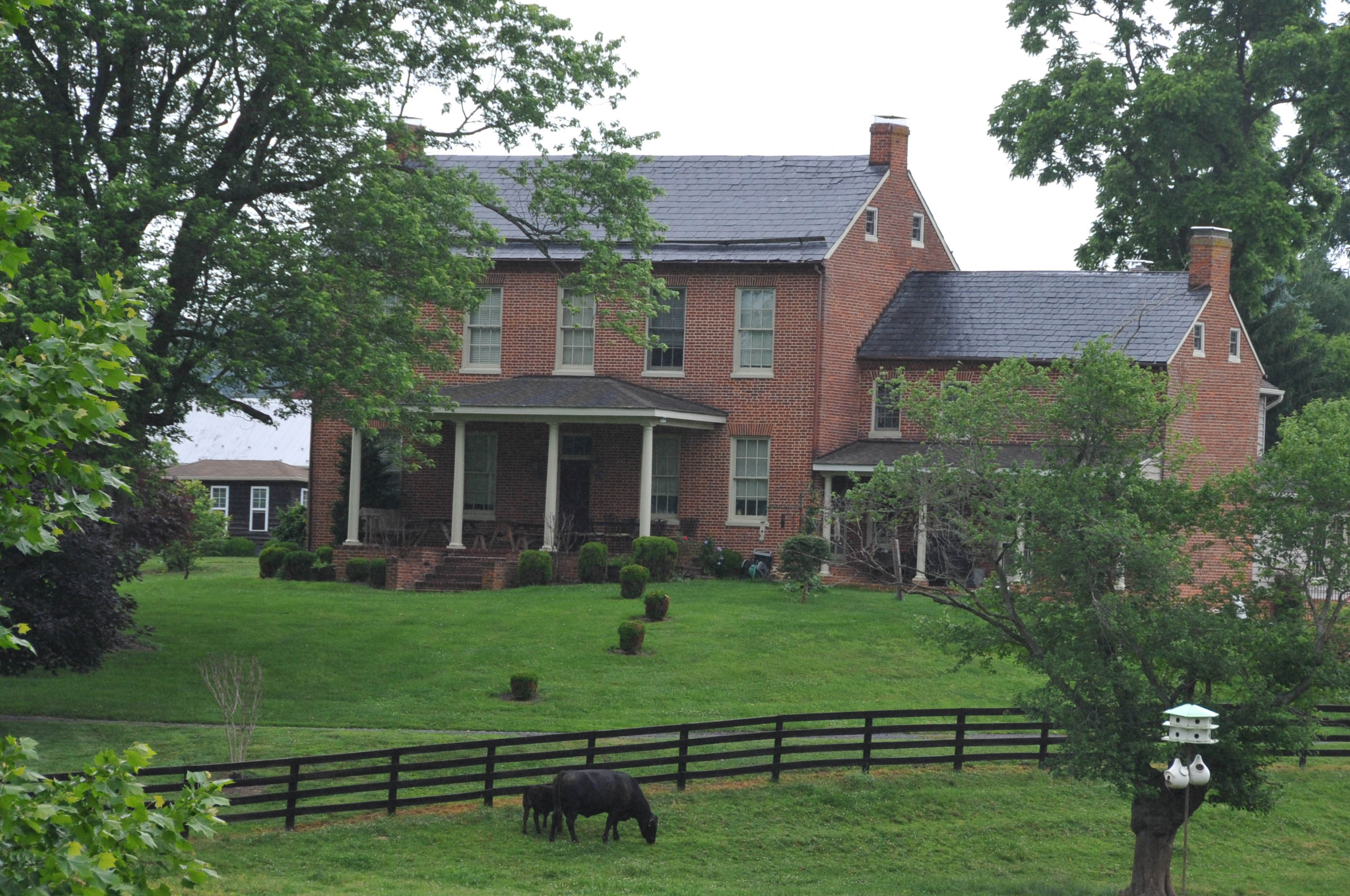
- Col. John Streett House in 2007

- Location within Maryland Location within the United States
- Location: Holy Cross Road, Street, Maryland
- Coordinates: 39°39′27″N 76°26′4″W
- Area: 3 acres (1.2 ha)
- Built: 1805
- Architectural style: Federal
- NRHP reference No.: 90001022
- Added to NRHP: July 16, 1990

The Col. John Streett House is a historic home located at Street, Harford County, Maryland, United States. It is a Federal style home composed of three brick sections, two of which are original and one a late 19th-century addition. The original dwelling built about 1805, consists of a 2 1/2-story, five-bay, gable-roofed main section and a 2-story, two-bay attached kitchen. The kitchen wing section has two unequal-sized rooms on the ground floor and a large loft room above, reached by a closed, corner stair. The home is named for Colonel John Streett (1762-1837), a man prominent in local politics and a hero of the War of 1812 who led Harford's 7th Regiment Cavalry at the Battle of North Point.

The Col. John Streett House was listed on the National Register of Historic Places in 1990.
