= Joseph M. Streett =

American politician and newspaper editor (1838–1921)

Member of the Maryland House of Delegates from the Harford County district
- In office 1870–1872 Serving with William M. Ady, William Baldwin, J. T. C. Hopkins, David Riley

Personal details
- Born: February 8, 1838 Harford County, Maryland, U.S.
- Died: September 24, 1921 (aged 83) Bel Air, Maryland, U.S.
- Party: Democratic
- Spouse: Juliet Evans Gover (died 1907)
- Children: 5
- Relatives: John Streett (grandfather)
- Education: Princeton University (AM)
- Occupation: Politician; newspaper editor

Joseph M. Streett (February 8, 1838 – September 24, 1921) was an American politician and newspaper editor from Maryland. He served as a member of the Maryland House of Delegates, representing Harford County from 1870 to 1872.

== Early life ==
Joseph M. Streett was born on February 8, 1838, in Harford County, Maryland, to Elizabeth and A.J. Street. He was the grandson of John Streett, who commanded the Harford cavalry at the Battle of North Point and was a member of the state legislature. Streett attended Sweet Air Academy in Baltimore County. He graduated from Princeton University in 1858. He later received a Master of Arts from Princeton. He studied law under Otho Scott and was admitted to the bar in Harford County in 1860.

== Career ==
Streett was a Democrat. He served as a member of the Maryland House of Delegates, representing Harford County from 1870 to 1872.

Around 1871, Streett became the editor of the Harford Democrat (later the Democrat and Enterprise). He worked there for 50 years. He bought out the Harford Dispatch in 1897. His son Gover also worked with him. He was the first president of the Maryland Editorial Association.

== Personal life ==
Streett married Juliet Evans Gover, daughter of George P. Gover, in 1856 or 1866. She died in 1907. They had one son and four daughters, Gover G., Elizabeth (married Frank H. Jacobs), Mrs. Robert F. Page, Juliett Gover (married William J. Price) and Mabel Malcolm (married Swepson Earle).

Streett died on September 24, 1921, at his home in Bel Air.
