= Ollerton Colliery F.C. =

Defunct amateur football club in Nottinghamshire

Ollerton Colliery
- Full name: Ollerton Colliery Football Club

Ollerton Colliery F.C. was an English football club.

== History ==
The club were members of the Yorkshire League for three years prior to the Second World War, finishing as runners-up in 1938. After the war they joined the Midland League but resigned after three years of finishing in league's lower reaches.

They also competed in the FA Cup from 1934–35 to 1949–50, reaching the 3rd Qualifying Round on three occasions.
