= John Streett =

American politician and military officer (born 1762)

Member of the Maryland House of Delegates from the Harford County district
- In office 1805–1812 Serving with Thomas Ayres, John Forwood, John Montgomery, John C. Bond, Elijah Davis, John Sanders, Stevenson Archer, Henry Hall
- Preceded by: Thomas Ayres, John C. Bond, John Forwood, John Montgomery
- Succeeded by: Joshua S. Bond, John Forwood of Jacob, John Forwood, John Sanders
- In office 1799–1800 Serving with Thomas Ayres, James Bond, Nicholas Day McComas, Thomas S. Bond, Elijah Davis, John Montgomery
- Preceded by: William S. Dallam, Abraham Jarrett, Nicholas Day McComas, John Montgomery
- Succeeded by: Elijah Davis, John Forwood, James Lytle, John Montgomery

Personal details
- Born: 1762 near Rocks, Harford County, Province of Maryland
- Died: 1836/1837
- Spouse: Martha St. Clair (m. 1786)
- Children: 9
- Relatives: Joseph M. Streett (grandson); Harry Streett Baldwin (great-grandson)
- Occupation: Politician; military officer; farmer
- Military career
- Rank: Lieutenant colonel
- Conflicts: War of 1812; Battle of North Point

John Streett (1762 – 1836/1837) was an American politician and military officer from Maryland. He served in the Maryland House of Delegates, representing Harford County from 1799 to 1800 and from 1805 to 1812. He served as a lieutenant colonel during the War of 1812.

== Early life ==
John Streett was born in 1762 at "Streett's Hunting Ground" near Rocks, Harford County, Maryland, to Elizabeth and Thomas Streett Jr. His father emigrated from England.

== Career ==
In 1799, Streett was commissioned as justice of the peace by Maryland's governor and council. Streett served as a member of the Maryland House of Delegates, representing Harford County, serving from 1799 to 1800 and from 1805 to 1812.

On February 13, 1812, Streett was commissioned as lieutenant colonel of the 7th cavalry regiment district, which comprised Baltimore County and Harford County. He commanded the Harford Horse, the Harford County cavalry regiment, at the Battle of North Point during the War of 1812. Major General Samuel Smith commended Streett for his "bravery and efficiency in action".

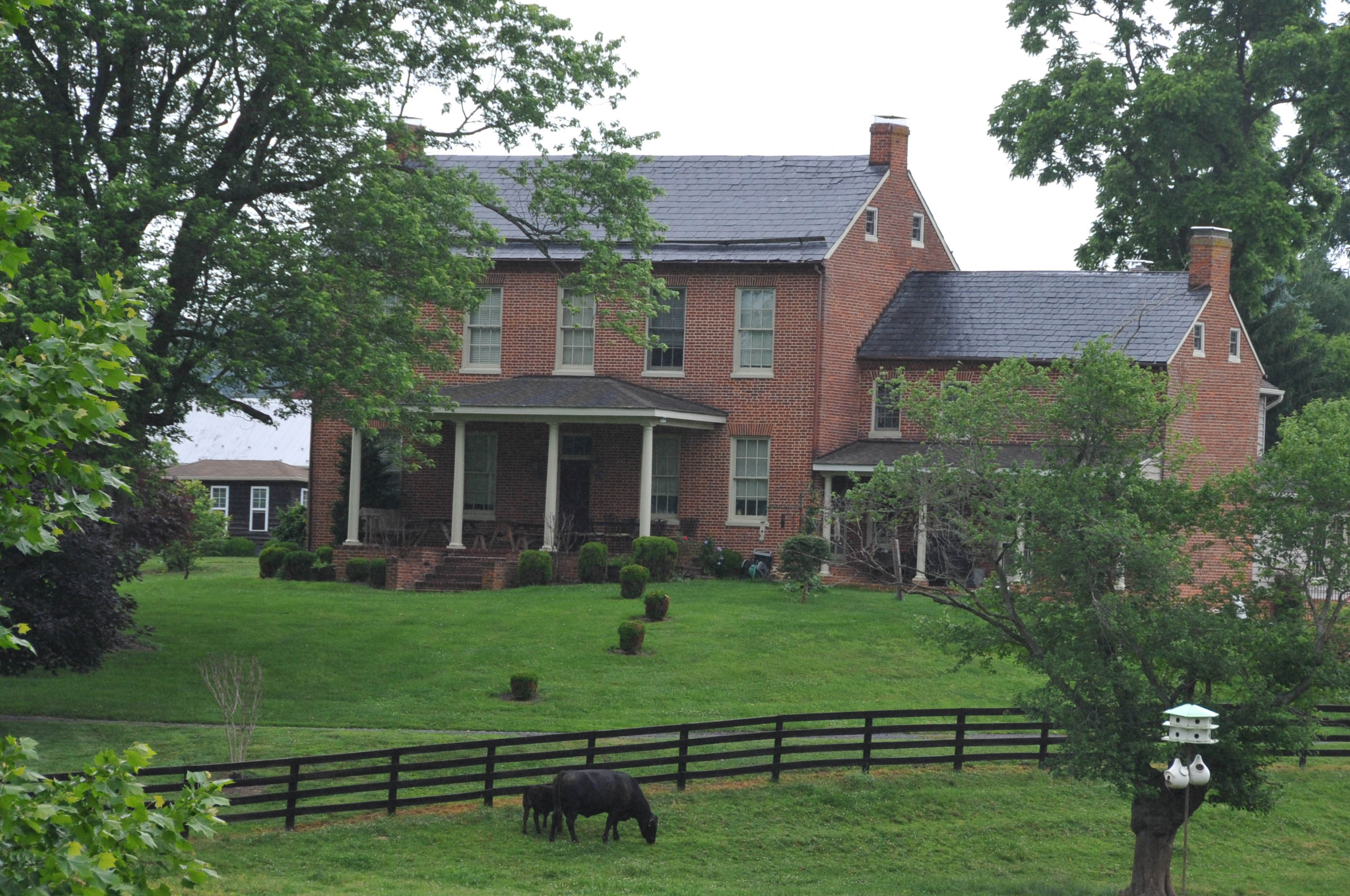
John Streett House

After the war, Streett lived on his farm of more than 3,000 acres (1,200 ha) in Harford County. Other sources believe the farm may have been as large as 5,000 acres (2,000 ha). In 1812, he was named a trustee of the Harford County Academy.

== Personal life ==
Streett married Martha St. Clair on December 11, 1786. They had seven sons and two daughters, James, John M., William, Shadrach, Thomas, St. Clair, Abraham, Mary and Charlotte. His grandson was Maryland politician Joseph M. Streett. His great-grandson was politician Harry Streett Baldwin.

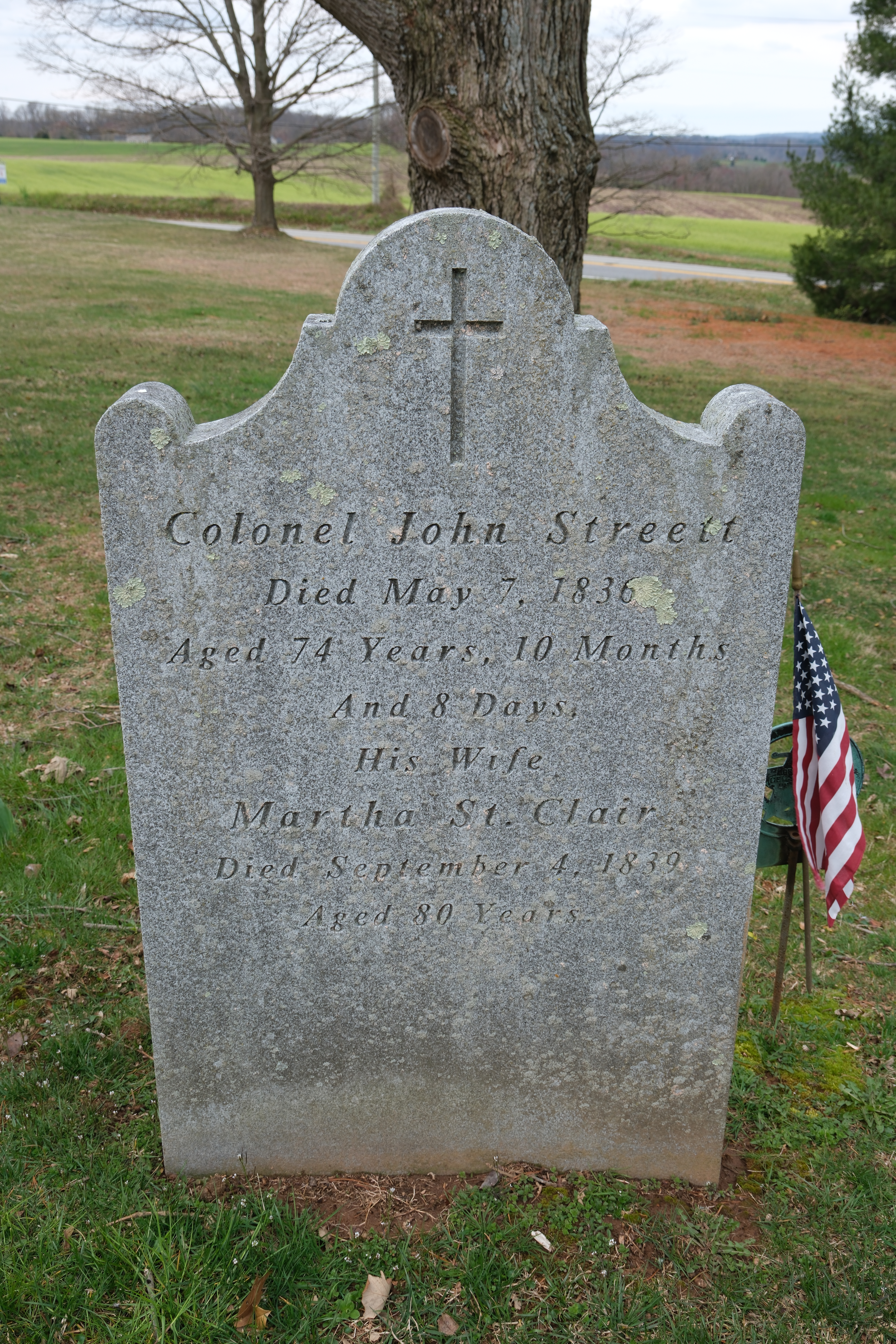
Grave of John Streett

In 1801, Streett built a brick, federal-style home that was later named the Col. John Streett House. Streett died in 1836 or 1837. He was buried at the family's cemetery. In 1998, his tombstone was replaced and dedicated.

== Legacy ==
The community of Street, Maryland, previously Highland, was named after Streett's family following the placement of a post office. It was named Street due to the large land holdings in the area by the Streett family.

In 1915, a portrait of Streett by painter Paul Hallwig was hung at the courthouse in Bel Air. In 1964, a Daughters of the American Revolution chapter was named "Colonel John Streett Chapter" in his honor.
