= Hucknall St John's F.C. =

Football club

Hucknall St John's
- Full name: Hucknall St John's Football Club
- Nickname: the Sinjins
- Founded: ?
- Dissolved: ?
- Ground: Brickyard Lane
- League: Nottinghamshire League
Home colours

Hucknall St John's F.C. was an English football club from Hucknall, Nottinghamshire, which participated in the FA Cup. In the 1897–98 FA Cup, they reached the first round when they were beaten 2-0 by Liverpool.

== Colours ==
The team wore broad black and yellow stripes.

== Ground ==
The club's ground was at Brickyard Lane.
