= Castle Ground =

Former sports ground in England

- Interactive map of Castle Ground
- Location: Nottingham, England
- Coordinates: 52.9395°N 1.1484°W
- Surface: Grass
- Record attendance: 12,000

Tenants
- Nottingham Forest (1878–1881); Notts County (1880–1894)

The Castle Ground was a cricket and football sports ground in the Meadows area of Nottingham, England. The ground was used by Nottingham Forest between 1879 and 1881, and by Notts County between 1880 and 1894.

== History ==
The Castle Ground was primarily a cricket ground, and aside from a pavilion at the northern end of the ground, had few spectator facilities. Notts County started using the ground in 1880, before moving to Trent Bridge in 1883. However, when Trent Bridge was in use by Nottinghamshire County Cricket Club in March, April and September, County played at the Castle Ground, as well as Nottingham Forest's Town Ground and later the City Ground.

Notts County were founder members of the Football League in 1888, and the first League match played at the Castle Ground was on 5 March 1889, with 3,000 spectators seeing Notts County beaten 4–0 by Bolton Wanderers. The record League attendance at the ground was set on 17 September 1892 when 12,000 spectators saw Notts County and Derby County draw 1–1. At the end of the 1892–93 season it was used as a neutral venue to host the promotion/relegation test match between Sheffield United and Accrington, with Sheffield United winning 1–0 in front of 6,000 spectators.

The final Notts County match at the Castle Ground was played on 15 September 1894, with 10,000 spectators seeing a 2–1 win over Darwen. The western part of the site was later bought by the Great Central Railway to build the line into Nottingham Victoria station, whilst the remainder had housing built on it.
