= Street, Maryland =

Unincorporated community in Harford County, Maryland, United States

- unincorporated community
- Interactive map of Street, Maryland
- Coordinates: 39°40′08″N 76°22′46″W
- Country: United States
- State: Maryland
- County: Harford

Street is a rural unincorporated community in northern Harford County, Maryland, United States.

One of the central villages in Street is Highland. The village had a station stop on the Maryland and Pennsylvania Railroad, at milepost 38.6, which served farms within the area until it ceased passenger service in 1954, then terminated freight service in 1958. The post office for Street, Maryland is located in the village of Highland. The village was once home to Highland High School, which later became Highland Elementary School. Highland Elementary School was shut down when the North Harford Elementary School was opened. The large building has other community purposes now, including the alternative Highlands School, Mason-Dixon Community Service, Highland Senior Center and the Street post office. The Habonim Dror Camp Moshava is also located in Street.

The Col. John Streett House was listed on the National Register of Historic Places in 1973. Gladden Farm and Mill Green Historic District were listed in 1993.
