= Ransome & Marles F.C. =

Ransome & Marles
- Full name: Ransome & Marles Football Club
- Ground: Northern Road, Newark on Trent

Ransome & Marles F.C. was an English football club based in Newark on Trent. They were the works team of Ransome & Marles.

== History ==
Ransome and Marles had joined the Yorkshire League for the 1939/40 season but of course the competition was suspended on the outbreak of war.

The club were members of the Midland League from 1945 to 1950, finishing as runners-up in their first campaign.

The club were members of the Central Alliance from 1950 to 1968, they were Division One Champions in 1955-56 and Division Two Champions in 1960–61.

They also competed in the FA Cup from 1927–28 to 1961–62, reaching the 4th Qualifying Round in 1948.
