= Jack Street (footballer, born 1934) =

English footballer (1934–2007)

Personal information
- Full name: John Street
- Date of birth: 27 July 1934
- Place of birth: Sheffield, England
- Date of death: 2007 (aged 72)
- Place of death: Sheffield, England
- Position: Winger

Senior career*
Years	Team	Apps	(Gls)
1951–1952	Bradford City	1	(0)
- Lincoln City
Total		1	(0)
- * Club domestic league appearances and goals

John Street (27 July 1934 – 2007) was an English professional footballer who played as a winger.

== Career ==
Street signed for Bradford City in November 1951 from 'minor football'. He made 1 league appearance for the club, before moving to Lincoln City in September 1952.

== Personal life and death ==
Street was born in Sheffield on 27 July 1934. He died there in early 2007, at the age of 72.

== Sources ==
- Frost, Terry (1988). Bradford City A Complete Record 1903-1988. Breedon Books Sport. ISBN 0-907969-38-0.
