= Jack Street (footballer, born 1928) =

English footballer (1928–2019)

Personal information
- Full name: John Street
- Date of birth: 30 May 1928
- Place of birth: West Derby, Liverpool, England
- Date of death: 26 April 2019 (aged 90)
- Place of death: Leeds, England
- Position: Wing half

Youth career
- Tranmere Rovers

Senior career*
Years	Team	Apps	(Gls)
1949–1950	Southport	7	(1)
1950–1951	Bootle Athletic		
1951–1953	Reading	0	(0)
1953–1955	Barrow	30	(5)
- Netherfield
Total		37	(6)
- * Club domestic league appearances and goals

John Street (30 May 1928 – 26 April 2019) was an English professional footballer who played as a wing half.

== Career ==
Born in West Derby, Liverpool, Street played for signed for Tranmere Rovers, Southport, Bootle Athletic, Reading, Barrow and Netherfield.

Street died in Leeds on 26 April 2019, at the age of 90.
