= Wells light =

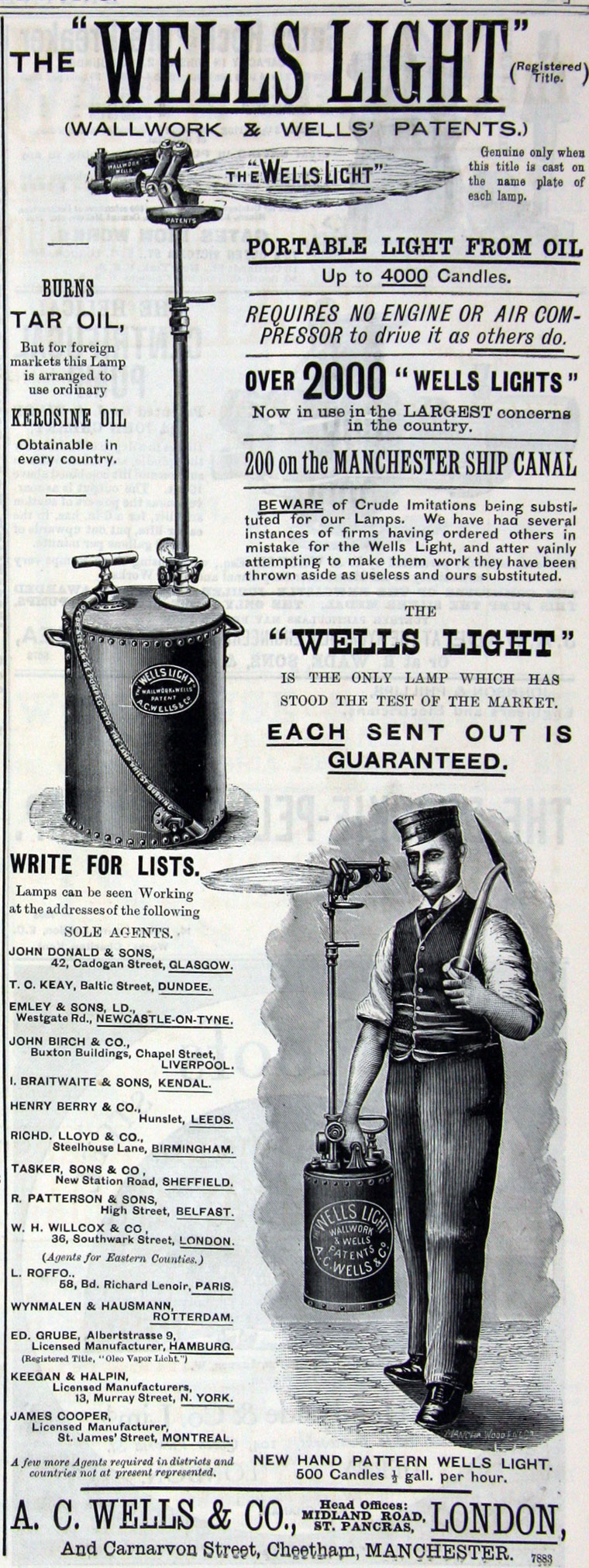
Advertisement, c. 1890

A Wells light was a large paraffin-fuelled (kerosene) blowlamp used for engineering work, particularly for illumination, in Victorian times. At a time before widespread electrical lighting, they were the most common form of high-powered portable illumination used for construction work, particularly railways, civil engineering, shipyards and ironworks.

== Operation ==
The Wells light was a typical blowlamp in principle, consisting of a floor-standing fuel tank with the burner on a tall post above it. It was distinguished by its large size, the more common plumber's blow lamp being a hand-held tool of about a pint in capacity. Wells lights were made in a number of sizes, the smallest Nº1 (Note: These are the numbers and sizes quoted for the Canadian market. Other sizes, somewhat larger and smaller, have been quoted in other adverts for the UK market.) being of 800 candlepower with a 15 inch flame. Weighing 75 pounds (34 kg) when filled, it was advertised as "can be carried by a boy". The largest Nº3 produced 2,000 candlepower, weighed 240 lbs, and was available with barrow wheels for portability.

The burner of the Wells light used a vaporiser that heated the oil before it escaped the nozzle, so vaporising immediately. As the lamp was intended for use with heavy, sooty oils as well, this vaporiser was constructed of a square frame of straight tubes. Each tube was closed with a screwed plug that could be removed for cleaning. For initial lighting, the vaporiser would be preheating by burning a little oil in a tray beneath the burner. The burners were mounted horizontally, although some models were produced with a flexible hose to the burner that allowed it to be rotated vertically.

Pressure was provided by a hand-worked stirrup pump on the tank. Once pressurised, a large lamp could burn for some hours before the pressure fell enough to require more pumping. A particular feature of the Wells design was that the tank could be refilled whilst the lamp was still burning (i.e. without releasing the pressure in the tank) by using this same pressurisation pump as a fuel pump to suck in oil from another container.

== Illumination ==
The major use of the Wells light was for the illumination of outdoor construction work. They were portable and simple to operate. Their fuel was cheap and commonly available, especially as the Wells' pressure burner could burn a much lower and cheaper grade of oil than the lamp paraffin that was pure enough to not clog a wick lamp. Oil fuels were still more expensive than coal gas though, so fixed lighting, such as in factories, remained on town mains gas.

Nottingham Forest played a floodlit match against Notts Rangers on 25 March 1889 at 7:45pm illuminated by 14 Wells lights.

=== Comparisons to electric lighting ===
The Wells light pre-dated mains electricity but was contemporaneous with early use of the arc lamp.

Electricity had two disadvantages: firstly it required an on-site generating plant. This was expensive and also represented a long-term capital investment that took time simply to build it beforehand. In some cases, the use of a semi-portable engine could provide a generating plant more quickly. Where the need for lighting was mobile, as for the construction of railways or canals, the Wells light had a clear advantage.

Secondly, although the carbon arc lamp was bright, and relatively economical for the illumination produced, individual lamps were expensive and complicated, although powerful. This encouraged their use as the minimum number of large lamps to cover an entire work site. As the arc lamp also has a very small source of light, this gave a particularly harsh lighting. There was a sudden contrast between the illuminated and shadow areas, especially where a point was only in sight of a single lamp. This was recognised as a trip and obstacle hazard, as well as making even the light areas difficult to work under. The Wells light was specifically contrasted with the point-source of the arc lamp and the relatively shadow-free illumination was cited as an advantage in their adverts. Because the smaller Wells lights were so portable, they could be carried into the best position to illuminate a deep shaft or inside a ship's hull.

=== Other uses ===
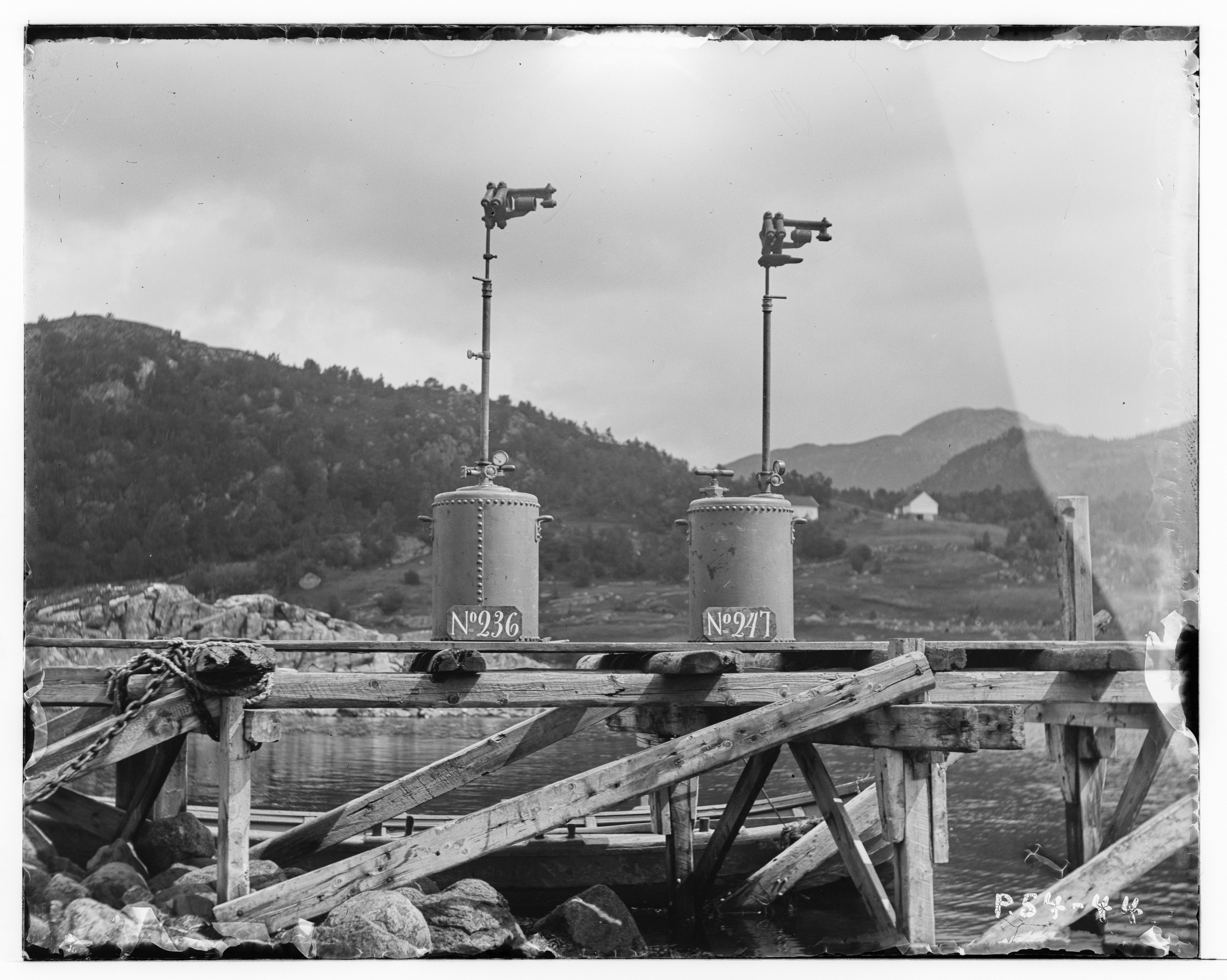
Wells lights in Norway

As well as illumination, the Wells light was also used where a large portable blowlamp was required for heating. They were sometimes used for heating iron rivets, inserted red hot, during the assembly of structural ironwork. Although such rivets were normally heated in small portable coke braziers (which also used a cheaper fuel), the Wells light was favoured for some final assembly work at height, as the smaller lights were considered lighter and easier to lift into place high atop a bridge.

Wells lights were also used in the erection and repair of large stationary steam engines. Typically this was for the shrink-fitting of components such as large crankpins in crankshafts or flywheels. The crankshaft web would be heated to expand it until the pin could be slid or gently hammered into place. On cooling, the pin would be securely held in place.

== A. C. Wells & Co. ==
A. C. Wells & Co. began in Cheetham, Manchester. Their first product was a range of engineer's lamps, simple cast-iron wick lamps that were widely used before electric battery torches. This type of lamp was not very bright and their limited light has been blamed for several engineering failures and losses of life, where an inspection was poorly carried out, owing to poor light.

The Wells light, with its pressure burner, was an attempt to produce the first really bright portable lighting. It was an immediate success, working well and having no significant competition from other makers. The name "Wells light" soon became a genericized name for this type of light, even though almost all were Wells' own, or licensed, products.

Wells lights were also produced under licence in Canada, by James Cooper of Montreal, and sold as 'Wallwork & Wells' patent lights.

In later years, Wells used their knowledge of small pressure vessels and pumps to produce a range of paint spraying equipment. Up to the 1960s, they also produced waste oil filtration equipment.
