= John Street (footballer, born 1926) =

English footballer

Personal information
- Full name: John Street
- Date of birth: 19 November 1926
- Place of birth: Rotherham, England
- Date of death: July 1988 (aged 61)
- Place of death: Sheffield, England
- Position: Goalkeeper

Youth career
- Liverpool

Senior career*
Years	Team	Apps	(Gls)
1945–1947	Sheffield Wednesday	0	(0)
1947–1948	Rotherham United	2	(0)
Total		2	(0)
- * Club domestic league appearances and goals

John Street (19 November 1926 – July 1988) was an English professional footballer who played as a goalkeeper.

== Career ==
Born in Rotherham, Street played for signed for Liverpool, Sheffield Wednesday and Rotherham United.
