= Gregory Ground =

Sports venue in Nottingham, England

- Interactive map of Gregory Ground
- Location: Lenton, Nottingham, England
- Coordinates: 52.950747°N 1.177895°W
- Surface: Grass

Construction
- Opened: 1885
- Closed: 1969

Tenant
- Nottingham Forest

The Gregory Ground was a football and cricket ground in Nottingham in England. It was the home of Nottingham Forest between 1885 and 1890. It was also used as a cricket ground by Lenton United in between 1888 and 1969.

== Nottingham Forest ==
When Nottingham Forest moved there, the pitch was 115 yards by 75 yards. The ground had been levelled and two small wooden stands erected. The pavilion and dressing room from the Parkside Ground had been transported here. The Midland Railway agreed to stop all trains at the nearby Lenton Station on match days.

Forest played their first match here on 26 September 1885, beating Stoke on Trent 4-0 watched by a crowd of 2000. Tinsley Lindley scored twice. Unwin and Fred Fox scored the others.

Forest played a floodlight match at the Gregory Ground on 25 March 1889 against Notts Rangers. The pitch was illuminated by 14 Wells lights.
