= Raleigh Athletic F.C. =

Raleigh Athletic
- Full name: Raleigh Athletic Football Club

Raleigh Athletic Football Club was an English association football club. It competed in the FA Cup from 1948 to 1955.
