= 1982–83 Northern Counties East Football League =

The 1982–83 Northern Counties East Football League season was the first in the history of Northern Counties East Football League, a football competition in England. The league was formed by the merger of the Midland League and the Yorkshire League.

== Premier Division ==
Northern Counties East Football League Premier Division
- Season: 1982–83
- Champions: Shepshed Charterhouse
- Promoted: Shepshed Charterhouse
- Matches: 380
- Goals: 1,202 (3.16 per match)

The Premier Division featured 20 clubs, joined from the Midland League and the Yorkshire League.

- Clubs joined from the Midland League:
  - Alfreton Town
  - Appleby Frodingham
  - Arnold
  - Belper Town
  - Boston
  - Bridlington Trinity
  - Eastwood Town
  - Guisborough Town
  - Heanor Town
  - Ilkeston Town
  - Mexborough Town Athletic
  - Shepshed Charterhouse
  - Skegness Town
  - Spalding United
  - Sutton Town
- Clubs joined from the Yorkshire League:
  - Bentley Victoria Welfare
  - Emley
  - Guiseley
  - Thackley
  - Winterton Rangers

=== League table ===
Pos	Team	Pld	W	D	L	GF	GA	GD	Pts	Promotion or relegation
1	Shepshed Charterhouse	38	24	8	6	109	34	+75	56	Promoted to the Southern Football League
2	Eastwood Town	38	21	11	6	71	41	+30	53	
3	Belper Town	38	21	10	7	75	32	+43	52	
4	Spalding United	38	19	14	5	69	44	+25	52	
5	Guiseley	38	21	9	8	72	35	+37	51	
6	Winterton Rangers	38	20	9	9	55	32	+23	49	
7	Thackley	38	18	11	9	62	42	+20	47	
8	Arnold	38	17	12	9	77	56	+21	46	
9	Heanor Town	38	17	12	9	50	43	+7	46	
10	Emley	38	14	11	13	74	58	+16	39	
11	Appleby Frodingham	38	15	9	14	59	61	−2	39	
12	Guisborough Town	38	16	6	16	59	59	0	38	
13	Alfreton Town	38	16	3	19	47	55	−8	35	
14	Sutton Town	38	12	10	16	59	64	−5	34	
15	Ilkeston Town	38	10	11	17	50	73	−23	31	
16	Boston	38	10	11	17	53	91	−38	31	
17	Bridlington Trinity	38	10	3	25	39	89	−50	23	
18	Skegness Town	38	5	8	25	46	82	−36	18	Resigned from the league
19	Bentley Victoria Welfare	38	6	2	30	44	107	−63	14	
20	Mexborough Town Athletic	38	2	2	34	32	104	−72	6	

Source: fchd
Rules for classification: 1) points; 2) goal difference; 3) number of goals scored.

=== Map ===
Location of the clubs in the 1982–83 NCEL Premier Division on a map of Yorkshire and the Humber
Location of the clubs in the 1982–83 NCEL Premier Division on a map of the East Midlands (ET = Eastwood Town, HT = Heanor Town)

== Division One North ==
Northern Counties East Football League Division One North
- Season: 1982–83
- Champions: Scarborough reserves
- Relegated: Hall Road Rangers
- Matches: 182
- Goals: 544 (2.99 per match)

Division One North was formed by the Yorkshire League clubs.

- Clubs joined from the Yorkshire League Division One:
  - Farsley Celtic
  - Leeds Ashley Road
  - Liversedge
  - North Ferriby United
  - Ossett Albion
  - Scarborough reserves
  - York Railway Institute
- Clubs joined from the Yorkshire League Division Two:
  - Bradley Rangers
  - Bridlington Town
  - Garforth Miners
  - Hall Road Rangers
  - Harrogate Town
  - Hatfield Main
  - Ossett Town

=== League table ===
Pos	Team	Pld	W	D	L	GF	GA	GD	Pts	Qualification or relegation
1	Scarborough reserves	26	17	6	3	53	20	+33	40	
2	North Ferriby United	26	14	10	2	48	24	+24	38	
3	Farsley Celtic	26	13	8	5	53	30	+23	34	
4	Harrogate Town	26	12	10	4	42	23	+19	34	
5	Garforth Miners	26	13	6	7	38	30	+8	32	
6	Ossett Town	26	13	5	8	43	30	+13	31	
7	Ossett Albion	26	8	10	8	41	38	+3	26	
8	Liversedge	26	8	9	9	35	35	0	25	
9	Bradley Rangers	26	8	7	11	41	51	−10	23	
10	Leeds Ashley Road	26	7	6	13	30	44	−14	20	Club folded
11	Hatfield Main	26	6	5	15	31	50	−19	17	
12	Bridlington Town	26	3	10	13	28	49	−21	16	
13	York Railway Institute	26	4	6	16	39	64	−25	14	
14	Hall Road Rangers	26	4	6	16	22	56	−34	14	Relegated to Division Two North

Source: fchd
Rules for classification: 1) points; 2) goal difference; 3) number of goals scored.

=== Map ===
Location of the clubs in the 1982–83 NCEL Division One North on a map of Yorkshire and the Humber

== Division One South ==
Northern Counties East Football League Division One South
- Season: 1982–83
- Champions: Lincoln United
- Relegated: Brigg Town; Kimberley Town
- Matches: 182
- Goals: 526 (2.89 per match)

Division featured 14 clubs, joined from the Midland League and the Yorkshire League.

- Clubs joined from the Midland League Premier Division:
  - Brigg Town
  - Long Eaton United
- Clubs joined from the Midland League Division One:
  - Arnold Kingswell
  - Kimberley Town
  - Staveley Works
- Clubs joined from the Yorkshire League Division One:
  - Frecheville Community
  - Hallam
  - Lincoln United
  - Sheffield
- Clubs joined from the Yorkshire League Division Two:
  - BSC Parkgate
  - Harworth Colliery Institute
  - Maltby Miners Welfare
  - Norton Woodseats
- Club joined from the Yorkshire League Division Three:
  - Denaby United

=== League table ===
Pos	Team	Pld	W	D	L	GF	GA	GD	Pts	Qualification or relegation
1	Lincoln United	26	16	7	3	55	25	+30	39	
2	Staveley Works	26	16	4	6	50	30	+20	36	
3	Sheffield	26	12	8	6	48	34	+14	32	
4	Frecheville Community Association	26	12	7	7	35	28	+7	31	
5	Denaby United	26	11	8	7	54	41	+13	30	
6	Maltby Miners Welfare	26	10	9	7	50	43	+7	29	
7	BSC Parkgate	26	9	6	11	37	37	0	24	
8	Arnold Kingswell	26	8	8	10	43	46	−3	24	
9	Norton Woodseats	26	10	3	13	32	37	−5	23	
10	Hallam	26	9	5	12	31	44	−13	23	
11	Harworth Colliery Institute	26	5	12	9	34	35	−1	22	
12	Long Eaton United	26	8	6	12	33	40	−7	22	
13	Brigg Town	26	4	7	15	26	59	−33	15	Relegated to Division Two South
14	Kimberley Town	26	3	8	15	29	58	−29	14	Relegated to Division Two South

Source: fchd
Rules for classification: 1) points; 2) goal difference; 3) number of goals scored.

=== Map ===
Location of the clubs in the 1982–83 NCEL Division One South on a map of the East Midlands

== Division Two North ==
Northern Counties East Football League Division Two North
- Season: 1982–83
- Champions: Rowntree Mackintosh
- Promoted: Rowntree Mackintosh; Pontefract Collieries
- Matches: 182
- Goals: 592 (3.25 per match)

Division featured 14 clubs, joined from the Yorkshire League and the York League.

- Clubs joined from the Yorkshire League Division Two:
  - Fryston Colliery Welfare
  - Grimethorpe Miners Welfare
  - Pilkington Recreation
  - Yorkshire Amateur
- Clubs joined from the Yorkshire League Division Three:
  - Brook Sports
  - Collingham
  - Harrogate Railway Athletic
  - Phoenix Park
  - Pickering Town
  - Pontefract Collieries
  - Selby Town
  - Tadcaster Albion
  - Thorne Colliery
- Club joined from the York Football League
  - Rowntree Mackintosh

=== League table ===
Pos	Team	Pld	W	D	L	GF	GA	GD	Pts	Promotion or relegation
1	Rowntree Mackintosh	26	18	6	2	73	29	+44	42	Promoted to Division One North
2	Pontefract Collieries	26	18	4	4	63	29	+34	40	Promoted to Division One North
3	Tadcaster Albion	26	15	5	6	48	34	+14	35	
4	Yorkshire Amateur	26	9	9	8	48	38	+10	27	
5	Pilkington Recreation	26	10	7	9	44	44	0	27	
6	Grimethorpe Miners Welfare	26	8	10	8	36	32	+4	26	
7	Collingham	26	10	6	10	40	43	−3	26	
8	Phoenix Park	26	11	3	12	43	44	−1	25	
9	Fryston Colliery Welfare	26	9	5	12	45	47	−2	23	
10	Thorne Colliery	26	9	5	12	37	57	−20	23	
11	Brook Sports	26	8	6	12	32	47	−15	22	
12	Selby Town	26	8	5	13	38	46	−8	21	
13	Pickering Town	26	7	6	13	26	40	−14	20	
14	Harrogate Railway Athletic	26	2	3	21	19	62	−43	7	

Source: fchd
Rules for classification: 1) points; 2) goal difference; 3) number of goals scored.

=== Map ===
Location of the clubs in the 1982–83 NCEL Division Two North on a map of Yorkshire and the Humber

== Division Two South ==
Northern Counties East Football League Division Two South
- Season: 1982–83
- Champions: Woolley Miners Welfare
- Promoted: Woolley Miners Welfare; Borrowash Victoria
- Matches: 182
- Goals: 586 (3.22 per match)

Division featured 14 clubs, joined from the Midland League and the Yorkshire League.

- Clubs joined from the Midland League Division One:
  - Borrowash Victoria
  - Creswell Colliery
  - Folk House Old Boys, who also changed name to Blidworth Miners Welfare
  - Graham Street Prims
  - Long Eaton Grange
  - Oakham United
  - Retford Rail
  - Rolls Royce (Hucknall)
  - Sutton Trinity
- Club joined from the Yorkshire League Division Two:
  - Kiveton Park
- Clubs joined from the Yorkshire League Division Three:
  - Stocksbridge Works
  - Wombwell Sporting Association
  - Woolley Miners Welfare
  - Worsbrough Bridge Miners Welfare

=== League table ===
Pos	Team	Pld	W	D	L	GF	GA	GD	Pts	Promotion or relegation
1	Woolley Miners Welfare	26	19	4	3	61	13	+48	42	Promoted to Division One South
2	Borrowash Victoria	26	16	8	2	57	20	+37	40	Promoted to Division One South
3	Worsbrough Bridge Miners Welfare	26	15	3	8	47	40	+7	33	
4	Oakham United	26	14	4	8	51	44	+7	32	
5	Stocksbridge Works	26	12	6	8	41	26	+15	30	
6	Graham Street Prims	26	12	5	9	49	33	+16	29	
7	Kiveton Park	26	11	6	9	52	40	+12	28	
8	Long Eaton Grange	26	9	6	11	40	45	−5	24	Resigned to the Central Midlands League
9	Blidworth Miners Welfare	26	10	3	13	40	46	−6	23	
10	Rolls Royce (Hucknall)	26	7	9	10	45	59	−14	23	Resigned from the league
11	Creswell Colliery	26	8	3	15	37	60	−23	19	Club folded
12	Retford Rail	26	6	4	16	29	57	−28	16	
13	Wombwell Sporting Association	26	3	8	15	18	44	−26	14	
14	Sutton Trinity	26	3	5	18	19	59	−40	11	

Source: fchd
Rules for classification: 1) points; 2) goal difference; 3) number of goals scored.

=== Map ===
Location of the clubs in the 1982–83 NCEL Division Two South on a map of the East Midlands
