= 1983–84 Northern Counties East Football League =

The 1983–84 Northern Counties East Football League season was the second in the history of Northern Counties East Football League, a football competition in England.

== Premier Division ==
Northern Counties East Football League Premier Division
- Season: 1983–84
- Champions: Spalding United
- Matches: 306
- Goals: 948 (3.1 per match)

The Premier Division featured 18 clubs which competed in the previous season, no new clubs joined the division this season.

=== League table ===
Pos	Team	Pld	W	D	L	GF	GA	GD	Pts	Promotion or relegation
1	Spalding United	34	20	8	6	76	43	+33	48	
2	Arnold	34	22	3	9	82	37	+45	47	
3	Emley	34	20	7	7	59	32	+27	47	
4	Alfreton Town	34	18	6	10	56	32	+24	42	
5	Eastwood Town	34	17	7	10	75	49	+26	41	
6	Ilkeston Town	34	14	11	9	49	38	+11	39	
7	Guiseley	34	14	11	9	54	48	+6	39	
8	Guisborough Town	34	16	6	12	58	54	+4	38	
9	Thackley	34	14	6	14	61	54	+7	34	
10	Winterton Rangers	34	13	7	14	48	42	+6	33	Club folded
11	Belper Town	34	12	8	14	47	46	+1	32	
12	Boston	34	10	12	12	46	57	−11	32	
13	Sutton Town	34	10	7	17	36	63	−27	27	
14	Appleby Frodingham	34	8	9	17	51	75	−24	25	
15	Mexborough Town Athletic	34	6	12	16	34	68	−34	24	
16	Bridlington Trinity	34	7	9	18	40	60	−20	23	
17	Heanor Town	34	7	9	18	31	68	−37	23	
18	Bentley Victoria Welfare	34	6	6	22	45	82	−37	18	

Source: fchd
Rules for classification: 1) points; 2) goal difference; 3) number of goals scored.

=== Map ===
Location of the clubs in the 1983–84 NCEL Premier Division on a map of Yorkshire and the Humber
Location of the clubs in the 1983–84 NCEL Premier Division on a map of the East Midlands (ET = Eastwood Town, HT = Heanor Town)

== Division One North ==
Northern Counties East Football League Division One North
- Season: 1983–84
- Champions: Pontefract Collieries
- Promoted: Pontefract Collieries
- Matches: 182
- Goals: 571 (3.14 per match)

Division One North featured 12 clubs which competed in the previous season, along with two new clubs, promoted from Division Two North:

- Pontefract Collieries
- Rowntree Mackintosh

=== League table ===
Pos	Team	Pld	W	D	L	GF	GA	GD	Pts	Promotion or relegation
1	Pontefract Collieries	26	17	5	4	43	24	+19	39	Promoted to the Premier Division
2	Rowntree Mackintosh	26	16	2	8	59	43	+16	34	
3	Farsley Celtic	26	12	6	8	51	33	+18	30	
4	Bradley Rangers	26	12	6	8	35	36	−1	30	
5	Ossett Albion	26	10	9	7	44	30	+14	29	Transferred to Division One Central
6	Garforth Miners	26	10	8	8	45	33	+12	28	
7	Harrogate Town	26	12	4	10	43	31	+12	28	
8	Scarborough reserves	26	9	7	10	42	43	−1	25	Resigned from the league
9	North Ferriby United	26	8	8	10	33	35	−2	24	
10	York Railway Institute	26	9	6	11	35	45	−10	24	
11	Bridlington Town	26	7	9	10	30	50	−20	23	
12	Hatfield Main	26	6	7	13	38	45	−7	19	Transferred to Division One Central
13	Liversedge	26	5	7	14	29	53	−24	17	
14	Ossett Town	26	4	6	16	34	60	−26	14	Transferred to Division One Central

Source: fchd
Rules for classification: 1) points; 2) goal difference; 3) number of goals scored.

=== Map ===
Location of the clubs in the 1983–84 NCEL Division One North on a map of Yorkshire and the Humber

== Division One South ==
Northern Counties East Football League Division One South
- Season: 1983–84
- Champions: Borrowash Victoria
- Promoted: Denaby United
- Matches: 182
- Goals: 526 (2.89 per match)

Division One South featured 12 clubs which competed in the previous season, along with two new clubs, promoted from Division Two South:

- Borrowash Victoria
- Woolley Miners Welfare

=== League table ===
Pos	Team	Pld	W	D	L	GF	GA	GD	Pts	Promotion or relegation
1	Borrowash Victoria	26	18	3	5	61	24	+37	39	
2	Denaby United	26	16	4	6	58	28	+30	36	Promoted to the Premier Division
3	Woolley Miners Welfare	26	14	6	6	61	33	+28	34	Transferred to Division One Central
4	Sheffield	26	12	6	8	44	38	+6	30	
5	Lincoln United	26	11	7	8	39	30	+9	29	
6	Maltby Miners Welfare	26	11	7	8	36	29	+7	27 (Note: Maltby Miners Welfare were deducted 2 points.)	Transferred to Division One Central
7	BSC Parkgate	26	11	5	10	29	29	0	27	Transferred to Division One Central
8	Staveley Works	26	10	5	11	41	34	+7	25	
9	Hallam	26	8	7	11	28	39	−11	23	
10	Long Eaton United	26	7	8	11	24	38	−14	22	
11	Frecheville Community Association	26	6	10	10	33	48	−15	22	
12	Arnold Kingswell	26	7	7	12	30	44	−14	21	
13	Norton Woodseats	26	5	4	17	23	59	−36	14	
14	Harworth Colliery Institute	26	5	3	18	19	53	−34	13	

Source: fchd
Rules for classification: 1) points; 2) goal difference; 3) number of goals scored.

=== Map ===
Location of the clubs in the 1983–84 NCEL Division One South on a map of the East Midlands

== Division Two North ==
Northern Counties East Football League Division Two North
- Season: 1983–84
- Champions: Harrogate Railway Athletic
- Matches: 182
- Goals: 569 (3.13 per match)

Division Two North featured 12 clubs which competed in the previous season, along with two new clubs:

- Armthorpe Welfare, joined from Doncaster & District Senior League
- Hall Road Rangers, relegated from Division One North

=== League table ===
Pos	Team	Pld	W	D	L	GF	GA	GD	Pts	Promotion or relegation
1	Harrogate Railway Athletic	26	19	6	1	72	23	+49	44	Promoted to Division One North
2	Armthorpe Welfare	26	17	5	4	48	26	+22	39	Promoted to Division One Central
3	Yorkshire Amateur	26	14	7	5	42	21	+21	35	Promoted to Division One North
4	Selby Town	26	12	7	7	48	30	+18	31	Promoted to Division One North
5	Phoenix Park	26	12	7	7	49	36	+13	31	Promoted to Division One North
6	Pickering Town	26	13	2	11	36	34	+2	28	Promoted to Division One North
7	Fryston Colliery Welfare	26	10	6	10	48	41	+7	26	Promoted to Division One Central
8	Thorne Colliery	26	10	6	10	43	41	+2	26	Promoted to Division One Central
9	Grimethorpe Miners Welfare	26	8	9	9	38	39	−1	25	Promoted to Division One Central
10	Hall Road Rangers	26	5	8	13	36	57	−21	18	Promoted to Division One North
11	Collingham	26	5	6	15	26	47	−21	16	Promoted to Division One North
12	Pilkington Recreation	26	4	7	15	33	55	−22	15	Promoted to Division One Central
13	Tadcaster Albion	26	3	9	14	23	56	−33	15	Promoted to Division One North
14	Brook Sports	26	5	5	16	27	63	−36	15	Resigned from the league

Source: fchd
Rules for classification: 1) points; 2) goal difference; 3) number of goals scored.

=== Map ===
Location of the clubs in the 1983–84 NCEL Division Two North on a map of Yorkshire and the Humber

== Division Two South ==
Northern Counties East Football League Division Two South
- Season: 1983–84
- Champions: Retford Town
- Matches: 156
- Goals: 522 (3.35 per match)

Division Two South featured nine clubs which competed in the previous season, along with four new clubs:

- Brigg Town, relegated from Division One South
- Kimberley Town, relegated from Division One South
- Retford Town, joined from the Derbyshire League
- Yorkshire Main, joined from the Sheffield Association League

=== League table ===
Pos	Team	Pld	W	D	L	GF	GA	GD	Pts	Promotion or relegation
1	Retford Town	24	18	3	3	63	22	+41	39	Promoted to Division One South
2	Kimberley Town	24	16	4	4	39	21	+18	36	Promoted to Division One South
3	Graham Street Prims	24	15	3	6	58	37	+21	33	Promoted to Division One South
4	Brigg Town	24	13	6	5	44	30	+14	32	Promoted to Division One Central
5	Oakham United	24	12	3	9	44	28	+16	27	Promoted to Division One South
6	Yorkshire Main	24	12	3	9	44	37	+7	27	Promoted to Division One Central
7	Worsbrough Bridge Miners Welfare	24	12	3	9	51	46	+5	27	Promoted to Division One Central
8	Wombwell Sporting Association	24	7	6	11	28	37	−9	20	Promoted to Division One Central
9	Blidworth Miners Welfare	24	8	3	13	32	52	−20	19	Promoted to Division One South
10	Kiveton Park	24	7	4	13	31	41	−10	18	Promoted to Division One South
11	Stocksbridge Works	24	6	5	13	40	44	−4	17	Promoted to Division One Central
12	Retford Rail	24	5	4	15	27	53	−26	14	Resigned
13	Sutton Trinity	24	0	3	21	21	74	−53	3	Resigned to the Central Midlands League

Source: fchd
Rules for classification: 1) points; 2) goal difference; 3) number of goals scored.

=== Map ===
Location of the clubs in the 1983–84 NCEL Division Two South on a map of the East Midlands
