= 1981–82 Yorkshire Football League =

The 1981–82 Yorkshire Football League season was the 56th and last season in the history of the Yorkshire Football League, a football competition in England.

At the end of the season, the league merged with Midland Football League and formed the new Northern Counties East Football League. Most of the Yorkshire League clubs were transferred to the Northern Counties East League divisions.

== Division One ==
Yorkshire Football League Division One
- Season: 1981–82
- Champions: Emley
- Matches: 240
- Goals: 667 (2.78 per match)

Division One featured 12 clubs which competed in the previous season, along with four new clubs, promoted from Division Two:

- Farsley Celtic
- Lincoln United
- Ossett Albion
- York Railway Institute

=== League table ===
Pos	Team	Pld	W	D	L	GF	GA	GD	Pts	Qualification or relegation
1	Emley	30	16	9	5	57	27	+30	41	Joined Northern Counties East League Premier Division
2	Guiseley	30	17	5	8	52	33	+19	39	Joined Northern Counties East League Premier Division
3	Leeds Ashley Road	30	15	9	6	44	30	+14	39	Joined Northern Counties East League Division One North
4	Scarborough reserves	30	15	7	8	51	38	+13	37	Joined Northern Counties East League Division One North
5	Bentley Victoria Welfare	30	13	9	8	46	37	+9	35	Joined Northern Counties East League Premier Division
6	Lincoln United	30	13	8	9	47	35	+12	34	Joined Northern Counties East League Division One South
7	Winterton Rangers	30	13	8	9	37	30	+7	34	Joined Northern Counties East League Premier Division
8	Thackley	30	13	7	10	51	35	+16	33	Joined Northern Counties East League Premier Division
9	Ossett Albion	30	10	11	9	28	26	+2	31	Joined Northern Counties East League Division One North
10	North Ferriby United	30	10	7	13	46	46	0	27	Joined Northern Counties East League Division One North
11	Sheffield	30	10	7	13	33	46	−13	27	Joined Northern Counties East League Division One South
12	Hallam	30	10	6	14	46	53	−7	26	Joined Northern Counties East League Division One South
13	Frecheville Community Association	30	11	3	16	39	48	−9	25	Joined Northern Counties East League Division One South
14	Farsley Celtic	30	10	2	18	38	54	−16	22	Joined Northern Counties East League Division One North
15	Liversedge	30	6	5	19	24	52	−28	17	Joined Northern Counties East League Division One North
16	York Railway Institute	30	5	3	22	28	77	−49	13	Joined Northern Counties East League Division One North

Source: fchd
Rules for classification: 1) points; 2) goal difference; 3) number of goals scored.
The points system until the 1990–91 season: 2 points for a win, 1 point for a draw and 0 points for losing.

=== Map ===
Location of the clubs in the 1981–82 Yorkshire League Division One on a map of Yorkshire and the Humber

== Division Two ==
Yorkshire Football League Division Two
- Season: 1981–82
- Champions: Harrogate Town
- Matches: 240
- Goals: 637 (2.65 per match)

Division Two featured ten clubs which competed in the previous season, along with six new clubs.

- Clubs relegated from Division One:
  - Bridlington Town
  - Kiveton Park
  - Maltby Miners Welfare
- Clubs promoted from Division Three:
  - Bradley Rangers
  - Grimethorpe Miners Welfare
  - Harrogate Town

=== League table ===
Pos	Team	Pld	W	D	L	GF	GA	GD	Pts	Qualification or relegation
1	Harrogate Town	30	16	8	6	56	29	+27	40	Joined Northern Counties East League Division One North
2	Ossett Town	30	17	6	7	51	29	+22	40	Joined Northern Counties East League Division One North
3	Garforth Miners	30	14	11	5	44	27	+17	39	Joined Northern Counties East League Division One North
4	Bradley Rangers	30	14	10	6	42	31	+11	38	Joined Northern Counties East League Division One North
5	Maltby Miners Welfare	30	13	8	9	48	39	+9	34	Joined Northern Counties East League Division One South
6	BSC Parkgate	30	13	8	9	43	40	+3	34	Joined Northern Counties East League Division One South
7	Norton Woodseats	30	14	5	11	35	28	+7	33	Joined Northern Counties East League Division One South
8	Hatfield Main	30	10	10	10	42	41	+1	30	Joined Northern Counties East League Division One North
9	Hall Road Rangers	30	11	8	11	32	37	−5	30	Joined Northern Counties East League Division One North
10	Harworth Colliery Institute	30	11	7	12	40	37	+3	29	Joined Northern Counties East League Division One South
11	Bridlington Town	30	9	6	15	35	55	−20	24	Joined Northern Counties East League Division One North
12	Grimethorpe Miners Welfare	30	7	9	14	39	42	−3	23	Joined Northern Counties East League Division Two North
13	Pilkington Recreation	30	5	12	13	29	41	−12	22	Joined Northern Counties East League Division Two North
14	Yorkshire Amateur	30	9	4	17	27	53	−26	22	Joined Northern Counties East League Division Two North
15	Kiveton Park	30	7	7	16	37	52	−15	21	Joined Northern Counties East League Division Two South
16	Fryston Colliery Welfare	30	5	11	14	37	56	−19	21	Joined Northern Counties East League Division Two North

Source: fchd
Rules for classification: 1) points; 2) goal difference; 3) number of goals scored.
The points system until the 1990–91 season: 2 points for a win, 1 point for a draw and 0 points for losing.

=== Map ===
Location of the clubs in the 1981–82 Yorkshire League Division Two on a map of Yorkshire and the Humber

== Division Three ==
Yorkshire Football League Division Three
- Season: 1981–82
- Champions: Pontefract Collieries
- Matches: 210
- Goals: 597 (2.84 per match)

Division Three featured 12 clubs which competed in the previous season, along with three new clubs.

- Clubs relegated from Division Two:
  - Rawmarsh Welfare
  - Thorne Colliery
- Plus:
  - Phoenix Park, joined from the West Riding County League

=== League table ===
Pos	Team	Pld	W	D	L	GF	GA	GD	Pts	Qualification or relegation
1	Pontefract Collieries	28	24	2	2	62	23	+39	50	Joined Northern Counties East League Division Two North
2	Denaby United	28	16	5	7	44	29	+15	37	Joined Northern Counties East League Division One South
3	Woolley Miners Welfare	28	16	4	8	51	28	+23	36	Joined Northern Counties East League Division Two South
4	Worsbrough Bridge Miners Welfare	28	13	9	6	54	35	+19	35	Joined Northern Counties East League Division Two South
5	Tadcaster Albion	28	13	7	8	52	37	+15	33	Joined Northern Counties East League Division Two North
6	Stocksbridge Works	28	11	8	9	51	35	+16	30	Joined Northern Counties East League Division Two South
7	Phoenix Park	28	12	5	11	37	37	0	29	Joined Northern Counties East League Division Two North
8	Wombwell Sporting Association	28	10	9	9	29	31	−2	29	Joined Northern Counties East League Division Two South
9	Pickering Town	28	11	4	13	38	41	−3	26	Joined Northern Counties East League Division Two North
10	Selby Town	28	9	6	13	34	39	−5	24	Joined Northern Counties East League Division Two North
11	Brook Sports	28	10	4	14	33	41	−8	24	Joined Northern Counties East League Division Two North
12	Collingham	28	8	7	13	27	36	−9	23	Joined Northern Counties East League Division Two North
13	Harrogate Railway Athletic	28	6	6	16	24	53	−29	18	Joined Northern Counties East League Division Two North
14	Rawmarsh Welfare	28	4	7	17	22	64	−42	15	Club folded
15	Thorne Colliery	28	4	3	21	39	68	−29	11	Joined Northern Counties East League Division Two North

Source: fchd
Rules for classification: 1) points; 2) goal difference; 3) number of goals scored.
The points system until the 1990–91 season: 2 points for a win, 1 point for a draw and 0 points for losing.

=== Map ===
Location of the clubs in the 1981–82 Yorkshire League Division Three on a map of Yorkshire and the Humber
