= Tony Hackworth =

English footballer (born 1980)

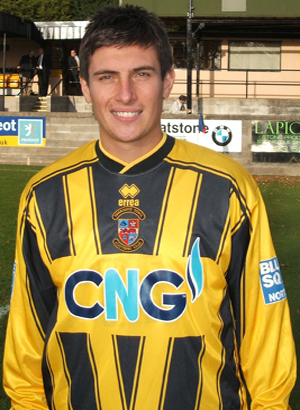
- Hackworth in 2008 playing for Harrogate Town

Personal information
- Full name: Anthony Hackworth
- Date of birth: 19 May 1980 (age 46)
- Place of birth: Durham, England
- Height: 6 ft 1 in (1.85 m)
- Positions: Central midfielder; central defender; striker

Youth career
- ?–1998: Leeds United

Senior career*
| Years | Team | Apps | (Gls) |
| 1998–2001 | Leeds United | 0 | (0) |
| 2001 | → Sogndal (loan) | 2 | (0) |
| 2001–2004 | Notts County | 54 | (1) |
| 2004 | → Scarborough (loan) | 11 | (3) |
| 2004–2007 | Scarborough | 113 | (19) |
| 2007 | Whitby Town | 20 | (6) |
| 2007–2008 | Harrogate Town | | |
| 2008–2011 | Whitby Town | 107 | (31) |
| 2011–2013 | Scarborough Athletic | 79 | (30) |
| 2013–2024 | Tadcaster Albion | | (1) |
| 2014–2018 | Pickering Town | | |

Managerial career
- 2023–2026: Pickering Town
- * Club domestic league appearances and goals as of 09:10, 2 October 2022 (UTC)

Anthony Hackworth (born 19 May 1980) is an English retired footballer and manager, who played as an attacking midfielder.He was most recently manager of. Pickering Town.

== Career ==
Hackworth started his career at Leeds United where he made three first team appearances, one in the League Cup and two in the UEFA Champions League against Barcelona and Lazio. He then moved to Sogndal on loan.

Hackworth moved to Notts County for a fee of £120,000 after failing to make an impact on the Leeds first team. He did not make much of an impact there either and only started 23 games in three years and only scored two goals in that time, against York City in the Football League Trophy, and AFC Bournemouth in the league. Hackworth had slightly more luck during his final few seasons at Notts County as he increased his appearances to 64 and his goal total to three but, in the end, he was transfer listed and then released following agreement of a settlement figure.

He moved to Scarborough on loan in March 2004 and made his debut against Leigh RMI. Following his release from Notts County, Hackworth signed permanently for Scarborough in summer 2004 and became a first team regular. Hackworth was released by Scarborough in May 2006 but re-signed again at the start of July 2006. He scored nine goals in 39 appearances in the 2006–07 season. After Scarborough's dissolution in 2007, Hackworth became a free agent.

A short move up the coast road saw Hackworth join Whitby Town and again he quickly became a first team regular. On 2 November 2007, Hackworth moved to Conference North team Harrogate Town. Hackworth went directly into the Harrogate squad and made his debut appearance at Wetherby Road against Alfreton Town on 3 November. His only goal for the club was against Stalybridge Celtic on 9 February 2008.

Following a spell of goalless games for Harrogate Town, Hackworth was finally released and rejoined his former club Whitby Town, where he became vice-captain.

== NCEL career ==
In July 2011 Hackworth signed for Scarborough Athletic, the phoenix club of his old Scarborough team. He made an instant impact, scoring a brace on his debut.

Hackworth has also branched into teaching and coaching, at George Pindar School in Scarborough, to complement his football career.

At the start of the 2013–14 season, Hackworth joined Tadcaster Albion but left for Pickering Town following the return of Mitch Cook as manager. He scored his first goals for the club on 21 December 2013 with a brace away to Garforth Town in a 5–3 win and his first home goal on 22 February 2014, opening the scoring in a 6–0 win. At Pickering, he has played variously as a central defender, central midfielder and centre forward.

In November 2014, manager Mitch Cook left Pickering after a defeat away to Parkgate and Hackworth was appointed caretaker-manager. In the first two matches under his stewardship, Pickering recorded 6–0 and 4–0 wins against Barton Town Old Boys and Liversedge respectively.

At the end of the 2014–2015 campaign, which was Hackworth's first as a manager, he left Pickering Town by mutual consent. He rejoined the club as an occasional player the following season but was sent off for violent conduct after six minutes against Retford United which would be his only appearance of the season.

On 9 June 2016 Hackworth became a player-coach at Pickering, under the management of Paul Marshall and alongside player-assistant manager Denny Ingram. His season was curtailed with an Achilles tendon injury in a pre-season friendly against Scarborough Athletic.

Hackworth re-joined Pickering as assistant manager upon the appointment of Steven Roberts as manager in January 2020, also registering as an occasional player.
