= Hackworth =

Hackworth is a surname. Notable people with the surname include:

- Ben Hackworth (born 1977), Australian writer and film director
- David Hackworth (1930–2005), United States Army colonel and prominent military journalist
- Ethel Hackworth (1889–1958), New Zealand accountant
- Green Hackworth (1883–1973), American jurist of international law
- John Hackworth (born 1970), American soccer coach
- John Wesley Hackworth (1820–1891), inventor of Hackworth valve gear
- Thomas Hackworth (died 1877), engineer and brother of Timothy Hackworth
- Timothy Hackworth (1786–1850), steam locomotive mechanical engineer
- Tony Hackworth (born 1980), English footballer
- Travis Hackworth (born 1975), American politician

== See also ==
- Hackworth valve gear, locomotive valve gear
