= North Street (stadium) =

Sports venue in Alfreton, England

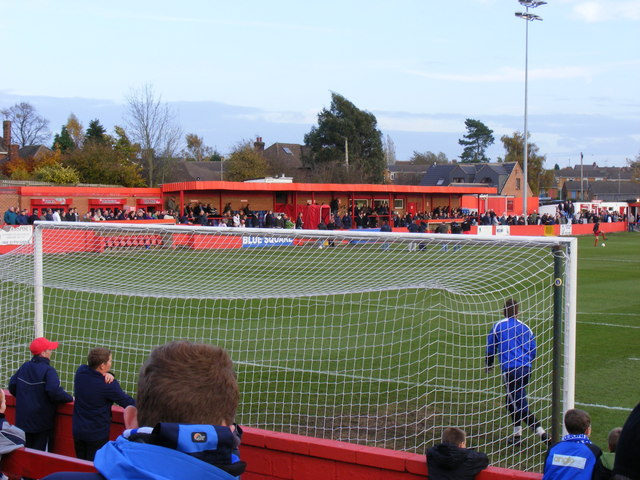
- Alfreton vs Bury Town FA Cup 2008/09
- Interactive map of North Street
- Full name: Solana Stadium
- Former names: Impact Arena
- Address: DE557FZ; Alfreton; United Kingdom
- Location: North Street; Alfreton; Derbyshire; DE55 7FZ
- Coordinates: 53.0945°N 1.3813°W
- Capacity: 3,600
- Surface: grass

Construction
- Opened: 1959

Tenants
- Alfreton Town F.C. (1959–present); Mansfield Marksman (1986–1988)

North Street, currently known as the Solana Stadium for sponsorship purposes, is a football stadium in Alfreton, Derbyshire, England. It is the home of Alfreton Town who currently play in the Northern Premier League. The stadium has a capacity of 3,600, of which 1,500 is seated.

Between 1986 and 1988, the stadium was home to a rugby league team called Mansfield Marksman. It has two seated stands and one standing stand. The fourth side contains a bar and the changing rooms. Alfreton recently unveiled plans to move to a new all-seater stadium in the near future, but that would depend on Alfreton's return to, and success in, the National League North and then the National League.

The Central Midlands League Cup Final takes place at North Stadium, and has done so since 2000–01.
