= Pinxton F.C. =

Association football club in Pinxton, England

Pinxton
- Full name: Pinxton Football Club
- Nickname: The Miners
- Founded: 1994
- Ground: The Welfare Ground
- Capacity: 2000
- Manager: Mark Richards
- League: United Counties League Division One
- 2024–25: United Counties League Division One, 8th of 19

Pinxton Football Club is a football club based in Pinxton, Derbyshire. They compete in the United Counties League Division One.

== History ==
Pinxton FC joined the Central Midlands League (CML) in 2004–05 and was promoted to the Supreme Division in their debut season after finishing in fourth place. They were then relegated back to the Premier Division but returned to the top division where they played until the league was re-organised along geographical lines to CML North and South in 2011.

During their time in they CML South, they won the League Cup and Floodlight Cup multiple times.

Under the management of Mark Richards they won the Central Midlands League in 2023-24 season and gained promotion to the United Counties League.

== Records ==
- FA Vase: Third round; 2015–16
- Central Midlands Floodlight Cup: 1st place
- Central Midlands League Cup: 1st place
- Central Midlands league title: 1st place; 2023/24
- Derbyshire Junior Cup Winners
