= Denny Ingram =

English footballer (born 1976)

Personal information
- Full name: Stuart Denevan Ingram
- Date of birth: 27 June 1976 (age 50)
- Place of birth: Sunderland, Tyne and Wear, England
- Height: 5 ft 10 in (1.78 m)
- Positions: Right-back; midfielder

Youth career
- 1993: Hartlepool United

Senior career*
| Years | Team | Apps | (Gls) |
| 1993–2001 | Hartlepool United | 228 | (10) |
| 2000 | → Scarborough (loan) | 11 | (0) |
| 2000–2001 | Scarborough | 38 | (1) |
| 2001–2003 | Northwich Victoria | 56 | (0) |
| 2003–2004 | Forest Green Rovers | 32 | (2) |
| 2004–2006 | Halifax Town | 63 | (1) |
| 2006–2007 | Scarborough | 15 | (0) |
| 2007–2009 | Harrogate Town | | |
| 2009–2010 | Whitby Town | | |
| 2010–2013 | Scarborough Athletic | | |
| 2013–2015 | Tadcaster Albion | | |
| 2015–2020 | Pickering Town | | |

Managerial career
- 2015–2019: Pickering Town (player-assistant)
- 2019–2020: Pickering Town (player-coach)
- * Club domestic league appearances and goals

Stuart Denevan Ingram (born 27 June 1976) is an English football player and coach. He previously played in the Football League with Hartlepool United as well as spells in the Conference National with Scarborough, Halifax Town, Forest Green Rovers and Northwich Victoria.

== Career ==
Ingram began his career as a trainee at Hartlepool United and made his first team debut on 20 November 1993 in a home game against Wrexham. Ingram would go on to win the Hartlepool Supporters' Young Player of the Year award at the end of the 1993–94 season. At the end of the 1995–96 season Ingram received the Supporters' Away Player of the Year and featured for Hartlepool in the club's unsuccessful Division Three 1999–2000 play-off season.

He subsequently left the club at the end of that season making his final appearance in a Hartlepool shirt against Northampton Town on 11 September 1999. Ingram had also spent some of his final year at Hartlepool on loan at Scarborough. In total, Ingram featured in 228 first team games for Hartlepool scoring ten times.

Having enjoyed a loan spell at Scarborough in the latter stages of his Hartlepool career, Ingram joined the club permanently in July 2000. Ingram spent a season at Scarborough before eventually leaving for Northwich Victoria of whom he spent two seasons with before moving clubs again.

Ingram linked up with Forest Green Rovers in the summer of 2003 under manager Colin Addison. Ingram made 32 appearances in the Conference National scoring 2 goals but he left the club after just one season.

Ingram returned north and signed for Halifax Town and featured for two years at Halifax making 61 league appearances in a spell that was ended when Ingram signed for Scarborough for an undisclosed fee in January 2006.

For the 2006–07 season, Ingram was made club captain by manager Mark Patterson and also was appointed as the club's new assistant manager. That season was to be the last for Scarborough however and for Ingram's stay with the club as crippling debts at the Conference club led to the club being wound up in June 2007.

Ingram then moved to Harrogate Town in June 2008. This was followed by a short spell at Whitby Town.

Ingram then eventually returned to football in Scarborough by signing for phoenix club Scarborough Athletic in August 2010.

He has continued coaching in the Scarborough area. In the summer of 2015 he departed Tadcaster Albion and joined Pickering Town as player/assistant manager. At the same time he was a member of the behaviour management unit at local secondary school George Pindar School but departed in mid 2017 to join the coaching staff at the Scarborough football Scholarship located at the Flamingo Land Stadium in Scarborough.

Ingram was appointed manager of Pickering Town, in February 2019. He was sacked on 3 January 2020.
