= Mike Pamment =

English footballer

Personal information
- Full name: Michael Ian Pamment
- Date of birth: 12 May 1945
- Place of birth: Huddersfield, England
- Date of death: 16 July 2006 (aged 61)
- Place of death: Dewsbury, England
- Position: Centre forward

Youth career
- Kirkburton Youth Club
- 1962–1964: Bradford City

Senior career*
Years	Team	Apps	(Gls)
1964–1965	Bradford City	1	(0)
1965–1970	Emley		
1970–1971	Mossley		
- Stalybridge Celtic
- Bradford (Park Avenue)
- Buxton
1973–19??	Emley		
- * Club domestic league appearances and goals

Michael Ian Pamment (12 May 1945 – 16 July 2006) was an English professional footballer who played as a centre forward.

== Career ==
Born in Huddersfield, Pamment joined Bradford City from Kirkburton Youth Club in 1962. He joined the first team in July 1964, and made 1 league appearance for the club. He left the club in 1965, and later played for Emley, Mossley, Stalybridge Celtic, Bradford (Park Avenue) and Buxton.

He joined Mossley from Emley in 1970, making 40 appearances and scoring 16 goals.

Pamment represented England at youth level.

== Sources ==
- Frost, Terry (1988). Bradford City A Complete Record 1903-1988. Breedon Books Sport. ISBN 0-907969-38-0.
