= Mickleover Royal British Legion F.C. =

Association football club in England

Mickleover Royal British Legion
- Full name: Mickleover Royal British Legion Football Club
- Founded: 1945
- Ground: Royal British Legion, Poppyfields Drive
- League: Central Midlands Alliance Premier Division South
- 2024–25: Central Midlands Alliance Premier Division South, 13th of 18
| Home colours | Away colours |

Mickleover Royal British Legion Football Club is an English football club based in the Derby suburb of Mickleover in Derbyshire. The club is a FA Charter Standard Club affiliated to the Derbyshire County Football Association. They are currently members of the Central Midlands Alliance Premier Division South.

== History ==
The club was founded in 1945, when the ground was given to the people of Mickleover by veterans upon returning from the World War II. The 1972–73 season saw the club enter Division one of the East Midlands Regional League. The 1980–81 season saw the club become league champions, finishing first in the Premier division.

In 1983 the club joined the premier division of the Central Midlands Football League as one of the founder members. The 1986–87 season saw the club enter the F.A. Vase for the first time. After finishing as league runners-up in the 1988-89 premier division campaign, the club then went onto win the premier division title in the next two seasons. After their second Premier division title win the club earned promotion to the Supreme division, but could only last two seasons in the league as their ground could not meet the grade to stay at the higher level, and were relegated back to the Premier division. The 1992–93 season also saw the club enter the FA Cup for the first time, though not progressing past the preliminary qualifying round, after losing 2–0 to Belper Town. The club gained promotion back to the supreme division when they came third in the premier division in the 1999–00 season, but only stayed one season in the top division before leaving the league to join the Midlands Regional Alliance.

The club started in Division two of the Midlands Alliance, and it took them until the 2007–08 season to get to Division one, when they finished as runners-up. The 2010–11 season saw the club promoted again to the Premier division as they crowned themselves champions of division one. The club then spent the next two seasons in the premier division, before rejoining the Central Midlands Football League in the South division.

== Ground ==
The club play their home games at Ypres lodge, Poppyfields Drive.

== Honours ==
- Central Midlands Football League
  - Premier Division Champions (2) 1989–90, 1990–91
- Midlands Regional Alliance
  - Division one champions (1) 2010–11
- East Midlands Regional League
  - Premier Division Champions (1) 1980–81

== Records ==
- FA Cup
  - Preliminary Round 1992–93
- FA Vase
  - First Round 1991–92
