= Sutton Trinity F.C. =

Sutton Trinity
- Full name: Sutton Trinity Football Club

Sutton Trinity F.C. was a football club based in Nottinghamshire. It competed in the Midland Football League, Northern Counties East League and Central Midlands League.
