= Hucknall Rolls Leisure F.C. =

Football club in England

Hucknall Rolls Leisure
- Founded: 1935
- Dissolved: 2016

Hucknall Rolls Leisure Football Club was a football club based in Hucknall, Nottinghamshire, England.

Rolls-Royce Welfare F.C. were formed in 1935 when Rolls's Hucknall factory first opened its gates. Dissolved and reformed in the 1970s, they were renamed as Hucknall Rolls-Royce F.C. in 1991, before a further change to Rolls-Royce Leisure F.C. in 2002. The club again dissolved and reformed in 2009, this time emerging as Hucknall Rolls Leisure F.C.. The club folded again in 2016.

The club played in the Nottinghamshire Senior League from 1991 to 1997 and the Central Midlands Football League from 1997 to 2009, before re-joining the Nottinghamshire Senior League after re-forming in 2009. In the 2002–03 season, the club reached the first round of the FA Vase.

They played on the same road, Watnall Road as Hucknall Town, but approximately a mile further from the town centre.
