= Club Thorne Colliery F.C. =

Association football club in England

Coordinates: 53°38′04.07″N 0°56′24.54″W

Club Thorne Colliery
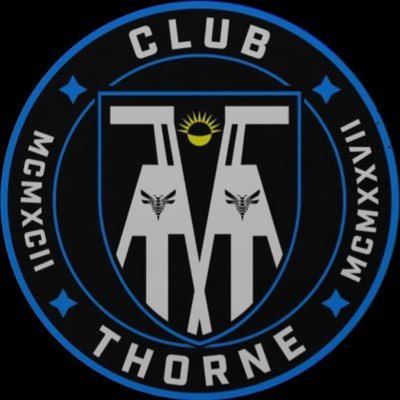
- Club Thorne badge, 2021
- Full name: Club Thorne Colliery
- Nickname: Colls
- Founded: 1927
- Ground: Chesterfield Poultry Stadium, Moorends
- Capacity: 1,200
- League: Northern Counties East League Division One
- 2025–26: Northern Counties East League Division One, 9th of 22
Home colours

Club Thorne Colliery (formerly Thorne Colliery F.C.) is a football club based in Moorends, Doncaster, South Yorkshire, England. They are currently members of the Northern Counties East League Division One and play at the Chesterfield Poultry Stadium.

== History ==
Little is known of the formation of the club, but Thorne first came to the limelight in 1927, then they reached the 3rd qualifying round of the FA Cup in their debut campaign in the competition. Five years later they joined the Yorkshire League, finishing as high as 4th in the years before the Second World War.

They re-joined the Yorkshire League after the war and finished as runners-up in 1946. A year later they went one better, being crowned as league champions. They were relegated to Division Two in 1950 but won promotion back to the top flight four years later. Their stay in Division One would only last another year before being relegated again, but their yo-yo status continued when they were promoted back again in 1956. Following another relegation in 1958, Thorne wouldn't get back to Division One again until 1966.

After another relegation in 1970, the club embarked on a decade of tough times which saw them relegated again to Division Three in 1974, remaining in the basement division for five years. Between 1978 and 1982 they went through a remarkable period where they won back-to-back promotions to reach Division One, before then going through back-to-back relegations to find themselves back in Division Three.

Their last relegation came at the wrong time, as the Yorkshire League merged with the Midland League to form the Northern Counties East League (NCEL), with Thorne being placed in Division Two North of the new competition. They only remained in the NCEL for five years before resigning and joining the Doncaster & District Senior League. They won the Doncaster League in all five years they stayed in the competition, before joining the Central Midlands League (CMFL) in 1993.

They won promotion to the top flight of the CMFL in 1995 but spent only three seasons in the Supreme Division before being relegated back to the Premier Division, remaining at that level until 2011, when they were placed in the North Division of the newly restructured CMFL.

In 2020, the club began improvements at the ground with a new roof to the main stand and for the first time in the club's history floodlights were installed. In 2021 they merged with the local junior team Moorends Hornets & Stingers to become Club Thorne, forming a development team, an Under 21's team and junior teams. This merge saw the release of the new club logo and a change from blue and white stripes to blue and black stripes to incorporate the main colours of both clubs.

The club is moving forward at an impressive rate. In 2021-22 the club missed out on promotion by losing on the final day of the season to Retford United knowing that three points would have secured the CMFL title and promotion to the NCEL. The following season they again finished third but won silverware by securing their first trophy since 1993 by beating Staveley Miners Welfare Reserves in the Central Midlands Floodlit Cup. The decision was made to switch to the Humber Premier League for the 2023–24 season and it paid off as the Championship was secured by an 8-point margin with only 4 league defeats all season. This brought promotion back to the NCEL, returning to that league after a 38-year hiatus.

=== Season-by-season record ===
Season	Division	Level	Position	FA Cup	Notes
1925–26	Doncaster & District Senior League	–		–	
1926–27	Doncaster & District Senior League	–	1st	–	
1927–28	Doncaster & District Senior League	–		3QR	
1928–29	Doncaster & District Senior League	–		2QR	
1929–30	Doncaster & District Senior League	–		1QR	
1930–31	Doncaster & District Senior League	–		–	
1931–32	Doncaster & District Senior League	–		–	
1932–33	Yorkshire League	–	8th/10	–	
1933–34	Yorkshire League	–	11/13	1QR	
1934–35	Yorkshire League	–	12/18	2QR	
1935–36	Yorkshire League	–	4/20	2QR	
1936–37	Yorkshire League	–	15/19	PR	
1937–38	Yorkshire League	–	13/20	EPR	
1938–39	Yorkshire League	–	13/20	2QR	
1945–46	Yorkshire League	–	2/15	1QR	
1946–47	Yorkshire League	–	1/20	2QR	
1947–48	Yorkshire League	–	8/20	2QR	
1948–49	Yorkshire League	–	17/20	PR	
1949–50	Yorkshire League	–	17/18	EPR	
1950–51	Yorkshire League Division 2	–	11/17	PR	
1951–52	Yorkshire League Division 2	–	9/13	–	
1952–53	Yorkshire League Division 2	–	8/14	–	
1953–54	Yorkshire League Division 2	–	4/16	–	Promoted
1954–55	Yorkshire League Division 1	–	17/18	–	Relegated
1955–56	Yorkshire League Division 2	–	2/16	–	Promoted
1956–57	Yorkshire League Division 1	–	16/18	–	
1957–58	Yorkshire League Division 1	–	18/18	–	Relegated
1958–59	Yorkshire League Division 2	–	9/13	–	
1959–60	Yorkshire League Division 2	–	10/15	–	
1960–61	Yorkshire League Division 2	–	6/19	–	
1961–62	Yorkshire League Division 2	–	10/14	–	
1962–63	Yorkshire League Division 2	–	12/15	–	
1963–64	Yorkshire League Division 2	–	13/15	–	
1964–65	Yorkshire League Division 2	–	13/15	–	
1965–66	Yorkshire League Division 2	–	2/15	–	Promoted
1966–67	Yorkshire League Division 1	–	4/17	–	
1967–68	Yorkshire League Division 1	–	16/17	PR	
1968–69	Yorkshire League Division 1	–	17/18	–	Relegated
1969–70	Yorkshire League Division 2	–	8/18	–	
1970–71	Yorkshire League Division 2	–	12/14	–	
1971–72	Yorkshire League Division 2	–	11/15	–	
1972–73	Yorkshire League Division 2	–	16/16	–	Relegated
1973–74	Yorkshire League Division 3	–	16/16	–	
1974–75	Yorkshire League Division 3	–	6/16	–	
1975–76	Yorkshire League Division 3	–	6/16	–	
1976–77	Yorkshire League Division 3	–	6/16	–	
1977–78	Yorkshire League Division 3	–	4/16	–	Promoted
1978–79	Yorkshire League Division 2	–	3/16	–	Promoted
1979–80	Yorkshire League Division 1	–	13/16	–	Relegated
1980–81	Yorkshire League Division 2	–	15/16	–	Relegated
1981–82	Yorkshire League Division 3	–	15/15	–	
1982–83	Northern Counties East League Division 2 North	–	10th/14	–	
1983–84	Northern Counties East League Division 2 North	–	8th/14	–	
1984–85	Northern Counties East League Division 1 Central	–	7th/16	–	
1985–86	Northern Counties East League Division 2	–	16th/16	–	
1986–87	Doncaster & District Senior League Premier Division	–	3rd/14	–	
1987–88	Doncaster & District Senior League Premier Division	–	2nd/11	–	
1988–89	Doncaster & District Senior League Premier Division	–	1st/13	–	
1989–90	Doncaster & District Senior League Premier Division	–	1st/13	–	
1990–91	Doncaster & District Senior League Premier Division	–	1st/14	–	
1991–92	Doncaster & District Senior League Premier Division	–	1st/13	–	
1992–93	Doncaster & District Senior League Premier Division	–	1st/15	–	
1993–94	Central Midlands League Premier Division	–	4th/15	–	
1994–95	Central Midlands League Premier Division	–	3rd/17	–	Promoted
1995–96	Central Midlands League Supreme Division	–	17th/17	–	
1996–97	Central Midlands League Supreme Division	–	7th/16	–	
1997–98	Central Midlands League Supreme Division	–	16th/16	–	Relegated
1998–99	Central Midlands League Premier Division	–	7th/15	–	
1999–00	Central Midlands League Premier Division	–	8th/16	–	
2000–01	Central Midlands League Premier Division	–	8th/17	–	
2001–02	Central Midlands League Premier Division	–	6th/20	–	
2002–03	Central Midlands League Premier Division	–	5th/17	–	
2003–04	Central Midlands League Premier Division	–	18th/19	–	
2004–05	Central Midlands League Premier Division	12	16th/19	–	
2005–06	Central Midlands League Premier Division	12	7th/20	–	
2006–07	Central Midlands League Premier Division	12	18th/19	–	
2007–08	Central Midlands League Premier Division	12	19th/20	–	
2008–09	Central Midlands League Premier Division	12	15th/15	–	
2009–10	Central Midlands League Premier Division	12	12th/16	–	
2010–11	Central Midlands League Premier Division	12	7th/15	–	
2011–12	Central Midlands League North Division	11	14th/17	–	
2012–13	Central Midlands League North Division	11	10th/17	–	
2013–14	Central Midlands League North Division	11	3rd/17	–	
2014–15	Central Midlands League North Division	11	5th/18	–	
2015–16	Central Midlands League North Division	11	10th/15	–	
2016–17	Central Midlands League North Division	11	15th/16	–	
2017–18	Central Midlands League North Division	11	11th/18	–	
2018–19	Central Midlands League North Division	11	14th/14	–	
2019–20	Central Midlands League North Division	11	–	–	Season abandoned due to COVID-19 pandemic
2020–21	Central Midlands League North Division	11	–	–	Season abandoned due to COVID-19 pandemic
2021–22	Central Midlands League North Division	11	3rd/18	–	
2022–23	Central Midlands League North Division	11	3rd/15	–	
Season	Division	Level	Position	FA Cup	Notes
Source: Football Club History Database

=== Notable former players ===
Players that have played in the Football League either before or after playing for Thorne Colliery:

- Bobby Browne
- James Fullwood
- Bob Johnson
- Ted Sagar

== Ground ==
The club plays at the Chesterfield Poultry Stadium, on Grange Road, Moorends, postcode DN8 4NA.

== Honours ==
=== League ===
- Yorkshire League
  - Champions: 1946–47
- Yorkshire League Division Two
  - Promoted: 1953–54, 1955–56, 1965–66, 1978–79
- Yorkshire League Division Three
  - Promoted: 1977–78
- Central Midlands League Premier Division
  - Promoted: 1994–95
- Doncaster & District Senior League Premier Division
  - Champions: 1988–89, 1989–90, 1990–91, 1991–92, 1992–93
- Humber Premier League
  - Champions: 2023–24

=== Cup ===
- Goole & Thorne FA Cup
  - Winners: 2010–11, 2013–14, 2023–24, 2024–25

== Records ==
- Best FA Cup performance: 3rd qualifying round, 1927–28
- Best FA Vase performance: 2nd qualifying round, 2026–27
