= York Football League =

Association football league in North Yorkshire, England

- Organising body: North Riding County Football Association
- Founded: 1897
- Country: England
- Divisions: Premier Division; Division One; Division Two; Division Three; Reserve A Reserve B Reserve C
- Number of clubs: 53 (15 in Premier Division) & 31 Reserve teams
- Level on pyramid: Level 11 (Premier Division)
- Promotion to: Northern Counties East League
- Domestic cup(s): Senior; Junior; Reserve
- Current champions: 2025–26: Tadcaster Magnets (Premier)
- Website: Official Website

The York Football League is a football competition based in North Yorkshire, England, founded in 1897. Currently it is known under the terms of a sponsorship agreement as the York Minster Engineering Football League. It is affiliated to the North Riding County Football Association, and the Premier Division sits at level 11 in the English football pyramid.

The most successful York clubs in history in terms of championships won are Dringhouses, York Railway Institute, Osbaldwick and Rowntrees. Three teams which now compete at higher levels in the English football system once competed in the York Football League: Pickering Town, Tadcaster Albion and Knaresborough Town.

== History ==
When the league was formed in the late 1800s, association football was just beginning to gather popularity in England. The Football League itself had only begun nine years before the York League; it was also founded prior to the city's now primary team York City. Upon the league's formation, nine teams entered into the league, the founding clubs were:

- Acomb
- Bishopthorpe
- Easingwold

- Ebor Wanderers
- Rowntrees
- Ulleskelf

- York St. Clements
- York Trinity
- York Wednesday

York League side Poppleton United in 1908.

Throughout the league's history, the only club from the first-ever season to continue in an unbroken existence is Rowntrees (now known as Nestlé Rowntree) until its demise at the start of the 2013–14 season.

However, Bishopthorpe United, Easingwold Town and St. Clements are at present still playing in the York League system, after refounding at various points.

Acomb and Rowntrees (along with fellow league team York YMCA) also went on to become founding members of the Yorkshire League for the 1920–21 season.

Some teams from the York League have climbed the football ladder in the past. Pickering Town played in the league before gaining promotion in 1972. They are currently in the Northern Counties East Premier Division. Also, York Railway Institute and Rowntrees were crowned champions of the Northern Counties East League Division One during the 1980s.

=== Recent times ===
Today it has a total of seven divisions (four for first teams and three for reserve teams) including the York League Premier Division which sits at level 11 of the English football league system. The league title has been regularly changing with no team retaining it since 2007–08 when Huntington Rovers achieved it. A number of teams that have recently joined the league have progressed successfully though the divisions to the Premier Division (Tadcaster Magnets, F1 Racing and Sporting Knavesmire).

New teams entering for the 2017–18 season were Clifford, Elm Bank, Stillington and Wistow and that season saw the league enter a Representative team into the FA Inter League Cup, reaching the final after wins over West Riding County Amateur league, Chester and the Wirral league, Staffordshire County League and Kent County League.

Former professional footballers with York City played in the league, including Andy McMillan and Christian Fox at Haxby United.

== Member clubs ==
=== 2024-25 Premier Division ===
- Dringhouses
- Dunnington
- Haxby Town
- Howden
- Kirkbymoorside
- Malt Shovel (Selby)
- Old Malton St Mary's
- Osbaldwick
- Poppleton FC
- Rawcliffe
- Tadcaster Magnets
- Tockwith
- Wigginton Grasshoppers

=== Premier Division ===
- Dringhouses
- Dunnington
- Easingwold Town AFC
- Huntington Rovers
- Kirkbymoorside
- Malt Shovel (Selby)
- Old Malton St Mary's
- Osbaldwick
- Poppleton United
- Rawcliffe
- Tadcaster Magnets
- Thorpe United
- Wigginton Grasshoppers

=== Division One ===
Bishopthorpe White Rose | Cawood | Duncombe Park | Haxby Town | Hemingbrough United | Pocklington Town 2nd | Pollington | Rufforth United | Strensall Tigers | Tockwith AFC

=== Division Two ===
Bubwith White Swan | Civil Service (York) | Cliffe | Clifford | Garforth LG | Helperby United | Heslington | Howden AFC | Stamford Bridge AFC | Walnut Tree | Wheldrake

=== Division Three ===
Church Fenton | Copmanthorpe | Ebor Wanderers | Elvington Harriers | Fulford | Hamilton Panthers | South Milford | Sporting Knavesmire | Wilberfoss AFC | York St John University YSJ (Sat)

=== Division Four ===
Barmby Moor | Bishop Wilton | Hensall Hawks Open Age | Knottingley Albion Junior York League | London NE Railway Builders | Marton Abbey | Selby Olympia | The Beagle | York Railway Institute | York Shamrocks

== Champions ==
=== Premier Division ===
| Club | Winners | Championship seasons |
|---|---|---|
| Dringhouses | 13 | 1932–33, 1957–58, 1958–59, 1959–60, 1960–61, 1961–62, 1993–94, 1994–95, 2003–04, 2004–05, 2005–06, 2010–11, 2023-24 |
| York Railway Institute | 11 | 1935–36, 1936–37, 1937–38, 1938–39, 1940–41, 1949–50, 1950–51, 1951–52, 1952–53, 1953–54, 1967–68 |
| Osbaldwick | 11 | 1983–84, 1984–85, 1985–86, 1986–87, 1987–88, 1988–89, 1989–90, 1990–91, 1991–92, 1992–93, 1996–97 |
| Rowntrees | 10 | 1901–02, 1930–31, 1963–64, 1964–65, 1965–66, 1972–73, 1975–76, 1978–79, 1980–81, 1981–82 |
| Knaresborough | 9 | 1902–03, 1903–04, 1904–05, 1908–09, 1924–25, 1925–26, 1928–29, 1933–34, 1934–35 |
| Riccall United | 7 | 1970–71, 1971–72, 1973–74, 1974–75, 1976–77, 1977–78, 2014–15 |
| Old Malton St. Mary's | 5 | 2000–01, 2011–12, 2013–14, 2015–16, 2018–19 |
| East Yorkshire Regiment | 3 | 1911–12, 1912–13, 1913–14 |
| Selby Olympia | 3 | 1926–27, 1927–28, 1931–32 |
| Pickering Town | 3 | 1955–56, 1966–67, 1969–70 |
| Boroughbridge | 3 | 1997–98, 1998–99, 1999–2000 |
| Market Weighton | 2 | 1954–55, 1956–57 |
| Haxby United | 2 | 1982–83, 2009–10 |
| Pocklington Town | 2 | 2001–02, 2002–03 |
| Huntington Rovers | 2 | 2006–07, 2007–08 |
| Wigginton Grasshoppers | 2 | 2016–17, 2017–18 |
| NER United | 1 | 1905–06 |
| York and Lancaster Regiment | 1 | 1906–07 |
| St. Paul's | 1 | 1907–08 |
| 5th Royal Irish Lancers | 1 | 1909–10 |
| Green Howards | 1 | 1910–11 |
| Lowther United | 1 | 1919–20 |
| Durham Light Infantry | 1 | 1923–24 |
| Northumberland Fusiliers | 1 | 1929–30 |
| Old Priory | 1 | 1939–40 |
| Tadcaster Albion | 1 | 1947–48 |
| Cookes | 1 | 1948–49 |
| Holme Rovers | 1 | 1962–63 |
| Vickers | 1 | 1968–69 |
| Brayton | 1 | 1979–80 |
| Bishopthorpe United | 1 | 1995–96 |
| Hamilton Panthers | 1 | 2008–09 |
| Dunnington | 1 | 2012–13 |
| Malt Shovel | 1 | 2024–25 |

=== Division One ===
Below is an incomplete list of previous champions at the second level of York League football. From 1923 until 1960 (with the exception of 1932–33, 1939–40 and 1946–47), this division was split into two groups, hence why for those years there are two champions.

- 1909–10 Tadcaster Albion
- 1910–11 Easingwold
- 1911–12 Lowther United
- 1912–13 Cawood United
- 1913–14 Acomb
- 1916–19 Suspended due to World War I
- 1919–20 Burton Lane Working Mens Club
- 1920–21 Fishergate Old Boys
- 1921–22 Archbishop Holgates Old Boys
- 1922–23 St Lawrences Working Mens Club
- 1923–24 St Lawrences Working Mens Club / Tadcaster Albion
- 1924–25 St Lawrences Working Mens Club / Selby Olympia
- 1925–26 Clarence C&I / Selby Olympia
- 1926–27 LNER Locomotive / South Bank Working Mens Club
- 1927–28 LNER Locomotive / Poppleton United
- 1928–29 LNER P'way / South Bank
- 1929–30 Selby East Common / Malton Bible Class
- 1930–31 Clarence C&I / RA & Signals
- 1931–32 Selby Brayton Road / Poppleton Road OB
- 1932–33 Tadcaster Albion]
- 1933–34 LNER Institute / 3rd Hussars
- 1934–35 Easingwold Town / Riccall United
- 1935–36 Market Weighton / Duncombe Park
- 1936–37 Fulford United / Old Malton St Mary's
- 1937–38 Fulford United / Acomb
- 1938–39 Old Priory / York Railway Institute
- 1939–40 Easingwold Town
- 1941–46 Suspended due to World War II
- 1946–47 New Earswick
- 1947–48 United Services / Poppleton Road Old Boys
- 1948–49 Fulford Road WMC / Market Weighton
- 1949–50 Fulford United / South Bank
- 1950–51 Cliftonville / Clifton & Rawcliffe Community Association
- 1951–52 Huntington Rovers / Catholic United
- 1952–53 BR Nomads / Knaresborough
- 1953–54 Pickering Town / Catholic United
- 1954–55 Riccall United / Haxby
- 1955–56 Duncombe Park / Ardua
- 1956–57 Olympia Mills (Selby) / South Bank
- 1957–58 Old Malton St. Mary's / Rowntrees
- 1958–59 Cawood / Dunnington
- 1959–60 Fulford United / Holme Rovers
- 1960–61 South Bank / Cookes
- 1961–62 Selby Shipyards / Civil Service
- 1962–63 Easingwold Town / NMU
- 1963–64 Olympia Mills (Selby) / British Sugar
- 1964–65 Huntington Rovers
- 1965–66 Fulford United
- 1966–67 NMU
- 1967–68 Vickers
- 1968–69 Wilberfoss Athletic
- 1969–70 Riccall United
- 1970–71 Old Malton St. Mary's
- 1971–72 Amotherby & Swinton
- 1972–73 New Earswick
- 1973–74 British Sugar
- 1974–75 Sheriff Hutton
- 1975–76 Pickering Town
- 1976–77 Rangers
- 1977–78 Melbourne
- 1978–79 Brayton
- 1979–80 Post Office
- 1980–81 York Railway Institute
- 1981–82 Huntington Rovers
- 1982–83 Dringhouses
- 1983–84 St John's College
- 1984–85 Cliftonville
- 1985–86 Huntington Rovers
- 1986–87 Griffin
- 1987–88 Olympia Mills
- 1988–89 Riccall United
- 1989–90 Westlers United
- 1990–91 New Earswick
- 1991–92 General Accident
- 1992–93 Wigginton Grasshoppers
- 1993–94 Boroughbridge
- 1994–95 New Earswick
- 1995–96 Rufforth United
- 1996–97 Pocklington SC
- 1997–98 General Accident
- 1998–99 York Sugar
- 1999–2000 Wigginton Grasshoppers
- 2000–01 Riccall United
- 2001–02 Malton Bacon Factory
- 2002–03 Wigginton Black Horse
- 2003–04 Thorpe United
- 2004–05 Nestlé Rowntree
- 2005–06 Heslington
- 2006–07 Haxby United
- 2007–08 Wilberfoss
- 2008–09 Riccall United
- 2009–10 York Railway Institute
- 2010–11 Wigginton Grasshoppers
- 2011–12 Terrington Glory
- 2012–13 Aviva
- 2013–14 Tadcaster Magnets
- 2014–15 F1 Racing
- 2015–16 Malton & Norton
- 2016–17 Poppleton United
- 2017–18 Thorpe United
- 2018–19 Pocklington Town 2nd

=== Division Two ===
Below is an incomplete list of previous champions at the third level of York League football. The most common structure for the league was where it was split into two groups at the same level, hence the reason for two champions in some seasons. At times there were even three groups under the same league at this level.

- 1909–10 Escrick Park
- 1910–11 Melbourne A S
- 1911–12 Clifton Church Institute
- 1912–13 Bishopthorpe
- 1913–14 South Bank
- 1914–19 Suspended due to World War I
- 1919–20 Central Mission
- 1920–21 Huntington
- 1921–22 Poppleton United
- 1922–23 Model School Old Boys
- 1923–24 Clarence C&I / LMS Railway
- 1924–25 Poppleton Road Old Boys / Fulford United
- 1925–26 Acomb AS / Church Fenton
- 1926–27 Acomb AS / Tadcaster United
- 1927–28 LNER P'way / RA Signals
- 1928–29 Huntington Rovers / St Georges Wesleyans
- 1929–30 Stamford Bridge
- 1930–31 Huntington Rovers / Poppleton Road Working Mens Club
- 1931–32 Acomb Carr Lane / Riccall United
- 1932–33 Stamford Bridge / St. Maurice's
- 1933–34 Heslington / Eborcraft
- 1934–35 Crescent Working Mens Club / RAOC
- 1935–36 Haxby Fellowship / Acomb
- 1936–37 Pocklington
- 1937–38 Clifton Colliery Institute
- 1938–39 Poppleton United / Cawood
- 1939–46 Suspended due to World War II
- 1946–47 Fulford Road WMC / Pocklington US
- 1947–48 Huntington Rovers / RAF Rufforth
- 1948–49 Cliftonville Youth Club / C&W Nomads / INL
- 1949–50 Clifton & Rawcliffe Community Association / South Bank / NMU
- 1950–51 Pavilion Rangers / Poppleton SF / Groves United
- 1951–52 Heslington / Knaresborough / Escrick Park
- 1952–53 Cookes / RAF Church Fenton / Gleneagles
- 1953–54 Fulford Road Working Mens Club / South Bank Reserves
- 1954–55 Duncombe Park / Crayke
- 1955–56 Wilberfoss Athletic / Haxby Reserves
- 1956–57 Cliftonville Reserves / Mail Coach United
- 1957–58 Yard Staff Reserves / LNER Builders
- 1958–59 Easingwold Town / Crayke
- 1959–60 Armstrong / Hammerton United
- 1960–61 Selby St. Mary's / NMU
- 1961–62 Heworth / Haxby Reserves
- 1962–63 Unicrux / Strensall
- 1963–64 Ampleforth / Escrick Brick & Tile Works
- 1964–65 Fulford United
- 1965–66 Newton-on-Ouse
- 1966–67 Wilberfoss Athletic
- 1967–68 Heworth
- 1968–69 Stillington
- 1969–70 Old Malton St. Mary's
- 1970–71 FC Melrose
- 1971–72 Post Office
- 1972–73 Pocklington Social Club
- 1973–74 Sheriff Hutton
- 1974–75 St John's College
- 1975–76 Moor Lane Youth Club
- 1976–77 Cawood
- 1977–78 Kingsway
- 1978–79 Water Lane Youth Club
- 1979–80 St John's College
- 1980–81 Chapelfields Youth Club
- 1981–82 Dringhouses
- 1982–83 Fulford United
- 1983–84 Olympia Mills (Selby)
- 1984–85 Selby Town Reserves
- 1985–86 Old Malton St Mary's
- 1986–87 Bishopthorpe United
- 1987–88 Westlers United
- 1988–89 Stamford Bridge
- 1989–90 General Accident
- 1990–91 Black a Moor
- 1991–92 Old Malton St Mary's
- 1992–93 York Sugar
- 1993–94 Fulford United
- 1994–95 Kartiers
- 1995–96 Malton Bacon Factory
- 1996–97 Copmanthorpe
- 1997–98 York Sugar
- 1998–99 Thorpe United
- 1999–2000 South Bank
- 2000–01 Hammerton United
- 2001–02 Tate & Lyle Selby
- 2002–03 Hamilton Panthers
- 2003–04 Easingwold Town
- 2004–05 Heslington
- 2005–06 Poppleton United
- 2006–07 Osbaldwick
- 2007–08 York Railway Institute
- 2008–09 Hemingbrough United
- 2009–10 St. Clements
- 2010–11 Terrington Glory
- 2011–12 Church Fenton White Horse
- 2012–13 Tadcaster Magnets
- 2013–14 F1 Racing
- 2014–15 Sporting Knavesmire
- 2015–16 Thorpe United
- 2016–17 Wilberfoss
- 2017–18 Haxby Town
- 2018–19 Malt Shovel

=== Division Three ===
Below is an incomplete list of previous champions at the fourth level of York League football in all forms.

- 1920–21 Poppleton United
- 1921–22 Phoenix Working Mens Club
- 1922–23 Manor School Old Boys
- 1923–36 not competed
- 1936–37 Riccall United
- 1937–38 Church Fenton
- 1938–65 not competed
- 1965–66 Cross Keys
- 1966–67 Fulford Road Working Mens Club
- 1967–68 Bishop Wilton
- 1968–69 Amotherby & Swinton
- 1969–70 FC Melrose
- 1970–71 New Earswick
- 1971–72 Cravens
- 1972–73 Sheriff Hutton
- 1973–74 Crown Hotel
- 1974–75 Moor Lane Youth Club
- 1975–76 Cawood
- 1976–77 Kingsway
- 1977–78 Chapelfields Youth Club
- 1978–79 Osbaldwick
- 1979–80 Aruda
- 1980–81 Ebor
- 1981–82 Olympia Mills (Selby)
- 1982–83 Selby Town Reserves
- 1983–84 Hemingbrough United
- 1984–85 Melbourne
- 1985–86 Poppleton United
- 1986–87 Westlers United
- 1987–88 Rangers
- 1988–89 Black a Moor
- 1989–90 Ben Johnsons
- 1990–91 Selby RSSC
- 1991–92 Post Office
- 1992–93 Whitemoor
- 1993–94 Kartiers
- 1994–95 Malton Bacon Factory
- 1995–96 Cawood
- 1996–97 Hamilton Panthers
- 1997–98 Thorpe United
- 1998–99 Stillington
- 1999–2000 Hammerton United
- 2000–01 Tate & Lyle Selby
- 2001–02 LNER Builders
- 2002–03 Wilberfoss
- 2003–04 Tockwith
- 2004–05 Sheriff Hutton
- 2005–06 Huby United
- 2006–07 St. Clements
- 2007–08 Heworth
- 2008–09 Terrington Glory
- 2009–10 Strensall
- 2010–11 Cliffe
- 2011–12 Tadcaster Magnets
- 2012–13 F1 Racing
- 2013–14 Sporting Knavesmire
- 2014–15 Kirkbymoorside
- 2015–16 Wilberfoss
- 2016–17 Heworth Green
- 2017–18 Malt Shovel
- 2018–19 Wheldrake
