= Retford Rail F.C. =

Retford Rail
- Full name: Retford Rail Football Club
- Dissolved: 1992
- Ground: The Rail, Retford

Retford Rail F.C. was a football club based in Retford, Nottinghamshire. It competed in the Midland Football League, Northern Counties East League and Central Midlands League. In 1992 they merged with Eaton Hall College to form B.R.S.A. Retford in the Lincolnshire Football League.
