= Ethel Hackworth =

First woman fellow of NZ Society of Accountants

Ethel Sarah Constance Hackworth (15 April 1889 – 5 February 1958) was a New Zealand accountant. She was the first woman to be a public accountant in the southern part of New Zealand.

== Early life ==
Hackworth was the daughter of Constance and Vernon Richard Hackworth. She was born in Riverton, New Zealand. (BDM reference 1889/16674). Also known as "Sheah Hackworth", she never married.

Her father was the manager of the Riverton Branch of the National Bank and was the third son of James Hackworth, Collector of Customs at Dunedin.

== Education ==
Hackworth attended Primary School in Riverton and later, Southland Girls High School where she excelled in mathematics.

== Career ==
During World War I, Hackworth worked in the government's Stamp Duties department in Invercargill for 18 months. She became the first female public accountant in the Canterbury, Otago and Southland region of New Zealand. She was later admitted as the first female Fellow of the New Zealand Society of Accountants.

== Community work ==
Hackworth was known to be extremely supportive of movements that supported the advancement of women. She was instrumental in founding a scholarship for fliers in Southland. She also served as the Secretary/Treasurer of the Invercargill Plunket Society for 28 years.

Hackworth died on 5 February 1958.
