= Pickering Town F.C. =

Association football club in England

Coordinates: 54°14′33.77″N 0°46′42.59″W

Pickering Town
- Full name: Pickering Town Community Football Club
- Nickname: The Pikes
- Founded: 1888
- Ground: Mill Lane, Pickering
- Capacity: 2,000
- Chairman: (England) Jamie Hopwood
- Manager: (England) Simon Heslop (player-manager)
- League: Northern Counties East League Premier Division
- 2025–26: Northern Counties East League Premier Division, 8th of 20
Home colours	Away colours

Pickering Town Football Club is an English football club based in Pickering, North Yorkshire. The club was founded in 1888 and are currently members of the Northern Counties East League Premier Division.

== History ==
Pickering Town football squad of 1919–20.

Pickering Town Football Club were first established in 1888, for many years the club competed in the local football leagues. One of the local leagues they competed in was the York Football League which they joined Division Two, in 1953–54. They were promoted to the league's top division after only one season.

In the early 1950s, the York League was heavily contended between York Railway Institute, Market Weighton and Pickering Town. Indeed, these were the teams in the top three when Pickering Town first won the York League in 1955–56.

The club dropped in form for the rest of the decade in comparison (although they did always finish in the top eight). During the 1959–60 season, they finished as league runners-up to Dringhouses.

=== Yorkshire and Northern Counties Leagues ===
Pickering eventually joined the Yorkshire Football League Division Three in 1972. They started well in the league, and during their second season were promoted to Division Two as champions. Pickering Town finished as runners-up to Bridlington Town in the 1974–75 season and thus were promoted to the top division of the Yorkshire League.

They dropped in form a couple of seasons later, getting relegated in two successive seasons. For the rest of the decade Pickering lingered around the mid parts of the Yorkshire League Division Three. In 1982 they became founding members of the Northern Counties East Football League and were in the NCE Premier Division from 1992. It was around this time that the club first entered the FA Challenge Cup, they knocked out Penrith before losing to North Yorkshire rivals, Northallerton Town in the next round.

A few seasons later in 1996–97, they knocked out Pontefract Collieries 2–1 in the competition, but lost to Bishop Auckland in the next round. In terms of the draw, the club has had very bad luck in the competition, as every time they reached the 1st qualifying round, they were forced to play away from home. In 1999 Pickering were relegated to the NCE First Division. This was to last only two seasons and promotion back to the Premier Division came in 2001.

=== Jimmy Reid transformation ===
The club underwent a transformation with manager Jimmy Reid and his assistant Steve Brown in charge. Reid was a former player with St Johnstone and York City and Brown a former "Pikes" player and coach at the Leeds United Academy. At the end of 2001–02 season Jimmy Reid left the club and Steve Brown took control.

At the start of the 2002–03 season, five first team regulars were lost for a variety of reasons which left the club struggling for much of the season. However, with only 4 defeats in the last 15 league games the club finished the season in 13th position.

2003–04 season was an exciting one for the club as they were in the top half of the league table all season and for much of it, with games in hand, looked possible championship contenders. However, with a glut of fixtures, and possibly with the knowledge that promotion to the re-structured Northern Premier League was not an option due to ground grading, at the season's end the club were not able to capitalise and finished in 5th position.

Early into the season 2004–05 owing to ever increasing business commitments Steve Brown stepped down as Manager to be replaced by ex-Ipswich Town and Newcastle United striker Alex Mathie, veteran of over 200 league games and 20 years as a professional.

The club has had much ground improvement work in recent years, including the erection of floodlights, a new 120 seater stand, covered standing accommodation and more recently an additional 100-seater stand behind the "scoreboard end" goal.

=== Recent events ===
In the 2005–06 season the club reached the quarter finals of the FA Vase the furthest in the club's history. The team eventually lost out to Nantwich Town.

After an encouraging start in the 2006–07 season, results took a turn for the worse over the winter period, and a run of one win in eleven games led to the resignation of Mathie as manager on 6 January 2007. Within a week, the board announced they had appointed ex-Pickering player and Mathie's assistant Mark Wood as the new manager.

The 2007–08 season saw the club finish in third in the NCEL Premier Division, their highest league position in over a decade. Off the pitch the club saw significant change and Pickering applied for promotion to the Northern Premier League. The club erected a removable fence for the cricket pitch side and improved the existing exterior toilet facilities. Ground development has continued with the club resurfacing and floodlighting the car parking facilities, adding new goals, corner flags and dugouts and improving the drainage of the pitch.

Mark Wood stepped down as manager early in the 2010–11 season and he was replaced by Scarborough FC former player Mitch Cook. Cook oversaw a change in philosophy mainly focused on youth and passing football. This approach had mixed success but the club eventually finished in 7th. Cook resigned just before the end of the season to take up the vacant managerial role at rivals Bridlington Town taking with him much of the playing squad.

Following Cook's resignation the club invited applications and eventually offered the job to former York City player and coach Peter Vasey.

They reached the second round qualifying of the FA Cup 3 times (1999–00, 2001–02 and 2003–04).

On 30 April 2013, the club won the North Riding Senior Cup for the first time in their history following a 3–0 win over Marske United. The goals were scored by Liam Shepherd, Liam Salt and Joe Danby in the second half. The game was played at the headquarters of the North Riding County FA in Stokesley in front of 439 spectators. The Marske United side contained future Premier League player Jordan Hugill.

=== Paul Marshall era ===
In the summer of 2015, Paul Marshall left the manager's job at Tadcaster Albion and was swiftly appointed as manager of Pickering Town. Denny Ingram joined him as a player and assistant manager. Pickering finished sixth in the first season under Marshall and second in 2017, behind only champions Cleethorpes Town. They reached the final of the North Riding Senior Cup in 2017, losing 3–1 to Whitby Town in the final at Middlesbrough's Riverside Stadium.

In May 2018 Pickering were promoted to Step 4 of non-league football following a 2–1 win away to Hall Road Rangers on the final day of the season. They entered the Northern Premier League Division One East in August of the same year. During the first half of the season the club entered the FA Trophy for the first time and reached the 3rd qualifying round knocking out 3 sides along the way before losing to Ramsbottom in a replay In February 2019, after 25 games Marshall stepped down as manager. He was regarded as the most successful manager of the modern era at Pickering. In 3 1/2 seasons in change his record was P187 W104 D33 L46 F426 A265.

=== Denny Ingram ===
Marshall was replaced by assistant manager Denny Ingram until the end of the season with fellow player coach Ryan Blott as his assistant.

After guiding Pickering Town to safety, the club announced that Denny Ingram would continue his role as manager into the 2019–20 Season. After a 3–0 defeat to Tadcaster Albion on New Year's Day 2020, Denny Ingram was relieved of his duties as manager.

=== Steve Roberts ===
Former Pickering Town player and Scarborough Athletic first team coach Steve Roberts joined the club as manager. He appointed former Pickering Town, Leeds United and Whitby Town player Tony Hackworth as his assistant. After just 10 games of the 18 remaining fixtures the season was cancelled due to the outbreak of COVID-19. This was also the case after the delayed start to 2020–21 season in which only 11 games were possible before the season was suspended on 3 November. The season was later announced as being void in March 2021. Pickering finished bottom of the Northern Premier League Division One East in 2021–22 and were relegated back to Step 5 after four seasons at the higher level. They were allocated a place in the 2022–23 Northern Football League. After a disappointing start to the season Steve was relieved of his duties after finding player recruitment a tough ask in a new league.

=== Rudy Funk ===
In September 2022 the club appointed the former Rainworth MW, Long Eaton, Scarborough Athletic and AFC Mansfield manager Rudy Funk as the new manager. Funk's side avoided relegation on the final day of the season after securing 10 points from the last 4 games. After the season ended the FA moved Pickering Town laterally at step 5 back to the 2023-24 Northern Counties East Football League. At the end of May, Rudy outlined his plans for the club to the local community in a bid to push on for promotion to step 4.

After a poor pre-season and losses in the first two games of the season he was sacked.

=== Tony Hackworth ===
Academy coach Tony Hackworth, along with Jamie Poole and skipper Wayne Brooksby, took charge for the month of August 2023.

On Monday 4 September 2023 Tony's position of Manager was made permanent. He managed the team during the 2014–15 season. He later returned to the club as a player but an achilles injury cut his time short. During the managerial spell of Steve Roberts, Hackworth became assistant manager, a position he held into the first 2 months of Funk's reign until November 2022. Since September 2021 he has been in joint charge of Pickering Town Scholarship programme overseeing the under 19's, playing a part in developing younger players. At the start of the 2024–25 season, Hackworth appointed former Pikes captain Joe Connor as his assistant. Despite taking The Pikes on their best FA Cup run in years and creating a squad that played some of the most attractive football seen at Mill lane, Hackworth and Connor were sacked on 25 January 2026 after a good start to the year with 2 wins, this caused some confusion and disappointment as to why from fans and sponsors alike.

== Current squad ==
Players signed on for the 2026–27 season:

Note: Flags indicate national team as defined under FIFA eligibility rules; some limited exceptions apply. Players may hold more than one non-FIFA nationality.

No.	Pos.	Nation	Player
—	GK	ENG	George Kenyon (on loan from Leeds United)
—	GK	ENG	Toby Beard
—	GK	ENG	Luke Jackson
—	DF	ENG	Connor Avison ( " Captain " )
—	DF	ENG	Blake Drury
—	DF	ENG	Sebastian Holowkiewicz
—	DF	ENG	Alfie Jackson
—	DF	ENG	Ben Leyland
—	DF	ENG	Marshall Nock
—	DF	ENG	Oscar Shaw
—	DF	ENG	Jamie Thornton
—	MF	IND	Joe Bhaskaran ‘’(on loan from Leeds United)’’
—	MF	ENG	Wayne Brooksby
—	MF	ENG	Matty Dawes
—	MF	ENG	Nathan Dyer

No.	Pos.	Nation	Player
—	MF	ENG	Simon Heslop
—	MF	VGB	Joel Marsden
—	MF	TCA	Emmanuel Martin
—	MF	ENG	Riley McGinty
—	MF	TCA	Rotskancy Mondelus
—	MF	WAL	George Thewlis
—	MF	ENG	Liam Tibbett
—	FW	ENG	Cameron Blackburn
—	FW	ENG	Charlie Colley
—	FW	CIV	Souleymane Coulibaly
—	FW	ENG	Michael Coulson
—	FW	ENG	Charlie Thompson
—	FW	ENG	Dominic Weston

== Ground ==
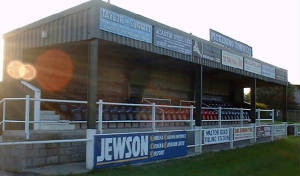
Main Stand

The Mill Lane ground seats 200, with a total capacity of around 2,000. It incorporates the Pickering Recreation Club clubhouse.

== Pickering Town L.F.C. ==
Pickering Town Ladies Football Club formed in 2025 and compete in the North Riding Women's Division 1.

== Records ==
- Best FA Cup performance: Second qualifying round, 2001–02, 2003–04, 2025–26
- Best FA Trophy performance: Third qualifying round, 2018–19 (replay), 2020–21, 2021–22
- Best FA Vase performance: Quarter-finals, 2005–06
- Top goalscorer: Liam Salt, 124
- Most appearances: Lewis Taylor, 286

== Honours ==
- Northern Counties East Football League Premier Division
  - Runners-up: 2017–18
- Northern Counties East Football League Premier Division
  - Runners-up: 2016–17
- Northern Counties East Football League Premier Division
  - Runners-up: 1992–93
- Northern Counties East Football League Division One
  - Runners-up: 1991–92, 2000–01
- Northern Counties East Football League Division Two
  - Champions: 1987–88
- Northern Counties East Football League Wilkinson Sword Trophy
  - Winners: 2000–01
- North Riding County Cup
  - Winners: 1990–91
- North Riding Senior Cup
  - Winners: 2012–13
  - Runners-up: 1993–94, 1994–95, 2016–17
- Yorkshire League Division Two
  - Runners-up: 1974–75
- Yorkshire League Division Three
  - Champions: 1973–74
- York Football League First Division
  - Champions: 1955–56, 1966–67, 1969–70
  - Runners-up: 1959–60
- York Football League Second Division
  - Champions: 1953–54
- Scarborough and District Football League Division One
  - Champions: 1930–31, 1950–51
  - Runners-up: 1946–47, 1949–50
