= Bradley Rangers F.C. =

Bradley Rangers
- Full name: Bradley Rangers Football Club
- Dissolved: 1992; 33 years ago
- Ground: Warrenside

Bradley Rangers F.C. was an English association football club based in Huddersfield, West Yorkshire.

== History ==
The club competed in the Yorkshire Football League and the Northern Counties East League, as well as the FA Vase. The club folded during the 1992–93 season and their playing record expunged.
