= Rowntrees F.C. =

Coordinates: 53°58′44.41″N 1°04′23.84″W

Nestlé Rowntree
- Full name: Nestlé Rowntree Football Club
- Nickname(s): Rowntrees; Jo Row
- Founded: 1890
- Dissolved: 2013
- Ground: Mille Crux, Yearsley, York
- Capacity: Unknown
- League: York Football League Premier Division
- 2012–13: York Football League Premier Division, 10th
Home colours	Away colours

Rowntrees Football Club, later Rowntree Mackintosh F.C. and Nestlé Rowntree F.C., was an English association football club from York, North Yorkshire. The team as their name suggests were affiliated to Rowntree's, a confectioner which later merged into Rowntree Mackintosh Confectionery, in turn taken over by Nestlé. The club was founded during Joseph Rowntree's ownership of Rowntree's.

== History ==
The club were founding members of the York Football League during 1897 under the name Rowntrees. They were one of the nine clubs taking part in the first season, and over the years from the original nine, they would be the only one to have an unbroken existence. After gaining promotion, they became one of the founding Yorkshire Football League clubs in 1920–21, the club competed in the league twice, finishing eighth both times.

In 1969, the teamname was changed to Rowntree Mackintosh because of the chocolate factory's merger with Mackintosh's. They entered into the new Northern Counties East Football League as founding members for the 1982–83 season. They were originally placed in NCEL Division Two and won that championship in their first season.

Upon promotion to the NCEL Division One, they finished runners-up in their debut season. This pattern continued in the league three more times in 1986–87, 1987–88 and 1988–89 before they eventually became champions of the league in 1989–90 – now bearing the name Nestlé Rowntree, after the takeover of their parent factory. Unfortunately for the club, although they were champions and had earned promotion, they were relegated to NCEL Division Two due to new ground regulations which had been introduced. They left that league the following season disheartened even though they had finished third.

=== Recent times ===
Following their relegation, the club played in the York Football League where they started out. York City players Andy Leaning, Neil Grayson and Andy McMillan played for the club.

In August 2013, the club withdrew from the league 116 years after they had first joined it, citing "a lack of players and continuing financial pressure", including the withdrawal of funding by Nestlé Rowntree and the sale of their ground to York St John University.

== Honours ==
- NCEL Division One
  - Champions: 1989–90
  - Runners-up: 1983–84, 1986–87, 1987–88, 1988–89
- NCEL Division Two North
  - Champions: 1982–83
- Teesside Football League
  - Champions: 1992–93, 1993–94
- West Yorkshire League Premier Division
  - Champions: 1998–99, 1999–2000
- York Football League
  - Champions: 1901–02, 1930–31, 1963–64, 1964–65, 1965–66, 1972–73, 1975–76, 1978–79, 1980–81, 1981–82
  - Runners-up: 1910–11, 1912–13, 1919–20, 1929–30
- York Football League Division One
  - Champions: 1957–58, 2004–05

== Club records ==
- Best league performance: Northern Counties East Football League Division One champions, 1989–90
- Best FA Vase performance: Second Round, defeated by Dunston Federation Brewery 0–1, 1988–89.
