= Phoenix Park F.C. =

Phoenix Park Football Club
- Dissolved: 1985

Phoenix Park F.C. was an English football club based in Bradford, West Yorkshire.

== History ==
The team participated in the Yorkshire Football League and the Northern Counties East League.
