= Wakefield F.C. =

Wakefield
- Full name: Wakefield Football Club
- Nickname: The Bears
- Founded: 1903 (as Emley)
- Dissolved: June 2014
- Ground: Welfare Ground, Emley (1903–2000); Belle Vue, Wakefield (2000–2007); College Grove (2007-2014)
- 2013–14: Northern Premier League; Division One North, 22nd
Home colours	Away colours

Wakefield Football Club was an English football club based in Wakefield, West Yorkshire. Originally based in the village of Emley, they were known as Emley AFC from 1903 to 2002. The club relocated to Wakefield in 2000 and were renamed Wakefield & Emley in 2002. They were subsequently renamed Wakefield-Emley in 2004 and then just Wakefield in 2006, before being wound up in June 2014.

== History ==
Formed in 1903 and began in the village of Emley in the local Huddersfield District League, the club graduated via the West Riding League to the Northern Premier League.

There is some debate as to what was the exact date of the club's formation. There is evidence of an Emley Football Club in 1884, but this is thought to have been a Rugby Football Club. In 1903 however Emley Clarence FC was formed and joined the Huddersfield League. It is from this club that the current club is descended.

For the first 66 years of its existence the club played in local junior leagues around Huddersfield. They were successful from time to time as the list of honours at junior level illustrates. However it was not until the 1960s that Emley started to make a noticeable impact in national non-league football.

=== Senior Non-League Football ===
By the mid-1960s Emley were the top non-league team in the Huddersfield District, thanks to a rich crop of local players, including; Michael Pamment, Chris Flew, Roger Wood, Ian Kettlewell, Granville Ellam, John Douglas and Melvyn Matley.

The club were entered into the FA Amateur Cup. At that time this was the leading national competition for amateur clubs. Emley first entered in 1968–69 and reached the last sixteen. They eventually lost to Barking, 1–0, in a second match, the first being abandoned. The abandoned match saw the highest crowd ever at Emley, 5,134. Following this they joined the Yorkshire League. They appointed former Huddersfield Town player Harry Fearnley as manager. In their first season in the Yorkshire Second Division Emley finished runners-up. Although Emley finished second, they were denied promotion by the Yorkshire League.

They did however win the Yorkshire League Cup that season. The following season saw Emley finally promoted to the First Division of the Yorkshire League.

=== Yorkshire League Domination: 1970s ===
The club now started to consolidate their position. The club now had the chance to enter the FA Cup, and when the FA Amateur Cup was ended in 1974 due to the rise influence of semi-professional football Emley entered the FA Trophy.

Emley won the Sheffield Cup in 1975–76, the game finished 2–0 over Worksop Town and was played at Hillsborough. Former Huddersfield Town player, Kevin McHale took over as manager and over the next seven seasons Emley won the Yorkshire League Championship four times and were runners-up the other three seasons. In addition they won the Yorkshire League cup three times, and the Sheffield Cup twice more.

This period cemented Emley as a non-league force in Yorkshire. During the 1979–80 season Emley reached the first round proper of the FA Trophy but were knocked out by Blyth Spartans. At the club Alec Hardy went on to be chairman for a total of 47 years, Eric Moorhouse was president for 13 Years, and Gordon Adamson secretary for 36 Years.

=== Northern Counties East League: 1980s ===
In 1981–82 Emley won the Yorkshire League and Cup Double, and the Reserve Division League and Cup Double. In addition the Reserves won the Huddersfield Invitation Cup. The Yorkshire League merged with the Midland League to form the Northern Counties East League, Emley became one of the founding clubs.

Emley added floodlights to their facilities in 1981, when these were quite rare for non-league clubs at that level. This paid off when floodlights became compulsory for clubs in the Northern Counties East League Premier Division. They initially finished around mid-table. Michael Pamment, who scored a record 305 goals for the club, took over as manager in 1978, and served until 1985. Under his reign Emley finished in third place and a later a runners up spot in 1985–86. At this time Emley entered the FA Vase rather than the trophy. This is the lesser of the two non-league cup competitions, but gave Emley a better chance of success.

Emley reached the semi-finals of the Vase in 1986–87, in a match against St. Helens Town. Emley lost 2–1 in extra-time. The following season the team reached the semi-finals once more, they beat Bashley 2–1 over two legs. John Francis later of Sheffield United and Burnley, scoring the all-important goal to take Emley to Wembley. 15,000 fans attended the final on 23 April 1988 against Colne Dynamoes. Colne won 1–0 after extra-time. Emley did however manage to win the league that season.

Emley thought they would be promoted to the newly formed Northern Premier League First Division, as they won their league. However, due to ground grading requirements they were not allowed in. The following year, after winning the league again and improving their ground they were promoted. During the 1988–89 season Emley won the Sheffield Cup for the fifth time.

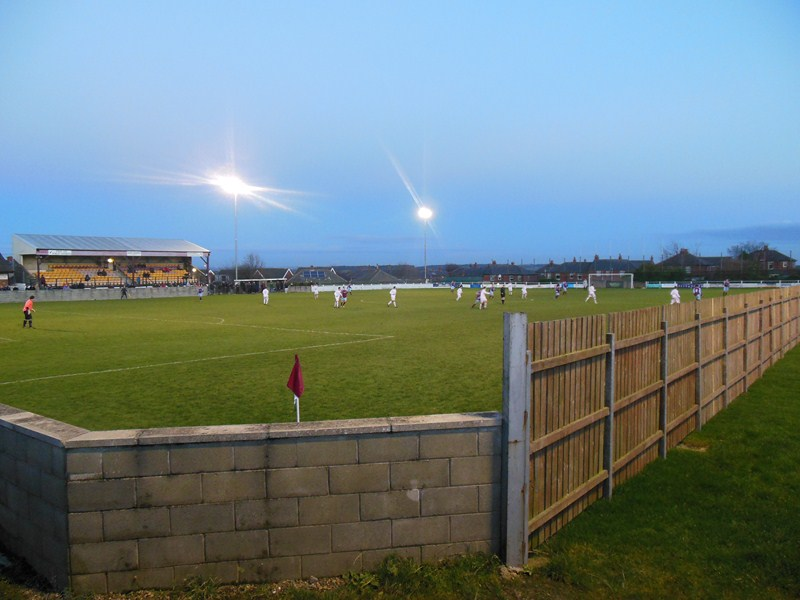
The Welfare Ground at Emley, the club's long time cosy home

=== Northern Premier League and the FA Cup: 1990s ===
Emley A.F.C colours.

Emley's first match in their new league was at Winsford United in Cheshire, they lost 3–0. Eventually in their début season in the league they finished 5th. The club were now in too high of a league to compete in the Vase, so they reverted to the FA Trophy. After a last minute goal in the third round, Emley had reached the quarter-finals of the Trophy for the first time. However, they lost the tie 3–0 to Kidderminster Harriers. Not to be disheartened the club went on to finish runners-up in their league that season.

Until 1991, Emley had never been further than the Third Qualifying Round of the FA Cup. They reached the First Round in a match against Bolton Wanderers, in front of 9,035 at Huddersfield Town's Leeds Road ground they went out 3–0. Emley won the Sheffield Cup for the seventh time and finished respectably in the league, but manager Gerry Quinn left in the summer to take over Altrincham and the most influential players in the squad went with him.

Emley struggled over the next three seasons, finishing in the bottom half of the league. Ronnie Glavin, formerly of Celtic and Scotland, eventually took over and rebuilt the side. Another good Trophy run in 1996–97 was ended by Conference side Kidderminster Harriers once again. The same season the club finished fourth in the NPL Premier Division, their highest ever position.

1997–98 was a great year for the club. Emley knocked out Morecambe in the First Round of the FA Cup. In the Second Round they faced, Lincoln City and after a replay and extra-time, Emley won the tie 4–3. They faced off against West Ham United who were 8th in the Premier League. The game was broadcast on Match of the Day. The match ended 2–1 with Paul David scoring for Emley, Frank Lampard and John Hartson grabbed the two Hammers goals (The team that day also featured Rio Ferdinand). The season was rounded off with the club's eighth Sheffield Cup win against Parkgate. The season also saw the club finish sixth in the NPL.

The following season they had another decent FA Cup run, but went out to Rotherham United 3–1. They also, reached the FA Trophy quarter-finals however, going out eventually to Cheltenham Town.

After a poor to average couple of seasons in the late 1990s and early 2000s and with ambitions from the chairman, it emerged that Emley were looking to leave the village. This was due to ground regulation gradings. The League brought in new regulations, concerning three-sided grounds, that meant Emley would be thrown out of the league unless they spent vast amounts upgrading. The club was unable to expand their ground and were forced to look for a new one. A ground share with Rugby League club Wakefield Trinity Wildcats was suggested, then the club played a couple of games at Wakefield's Belle Vue ground. Although primarily a rugby city, the club moved to Wakefield's Belle Vue for their home games in the 2000–01 season.

=== Club moves to Wakefield ===
At their new ground striker Simeon Bambrook scored 30 goals and Danny Day 23 for Emley, during the season. They led the league for much of the season, amassing 100 points but finished second. Emley reached the Sheffield Cup Final, only to lose to Doncaster Rovers 2–1 at Hillsborough and Simeon Bambrook gained an England semi-professional side call-up.

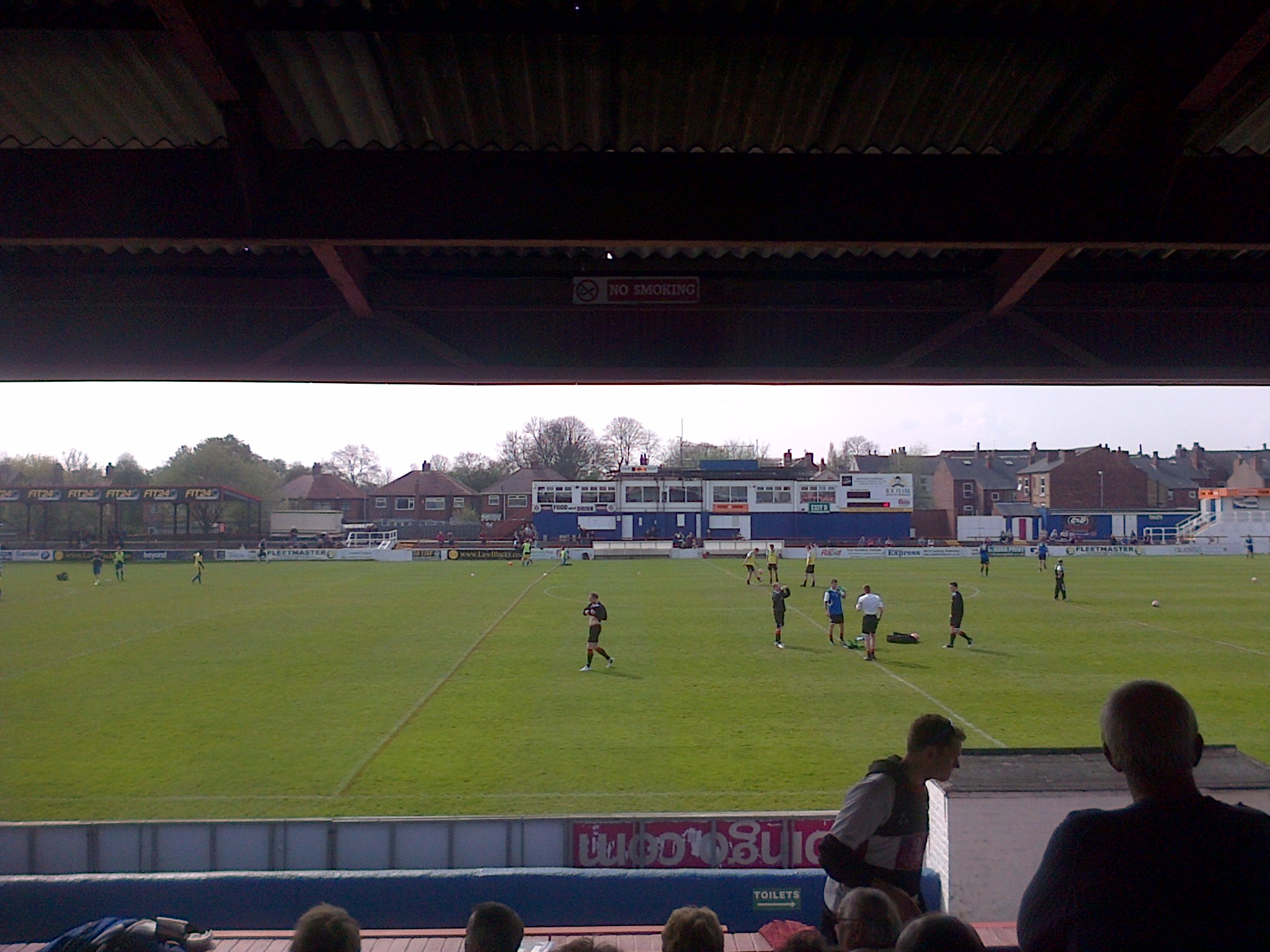
Belle Vue, Arthur Street side

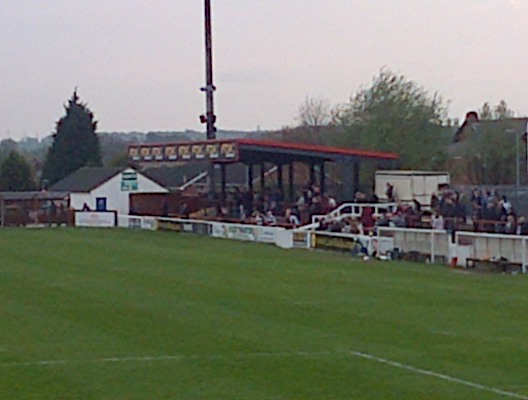
Belle Vue, Arthur Street stand

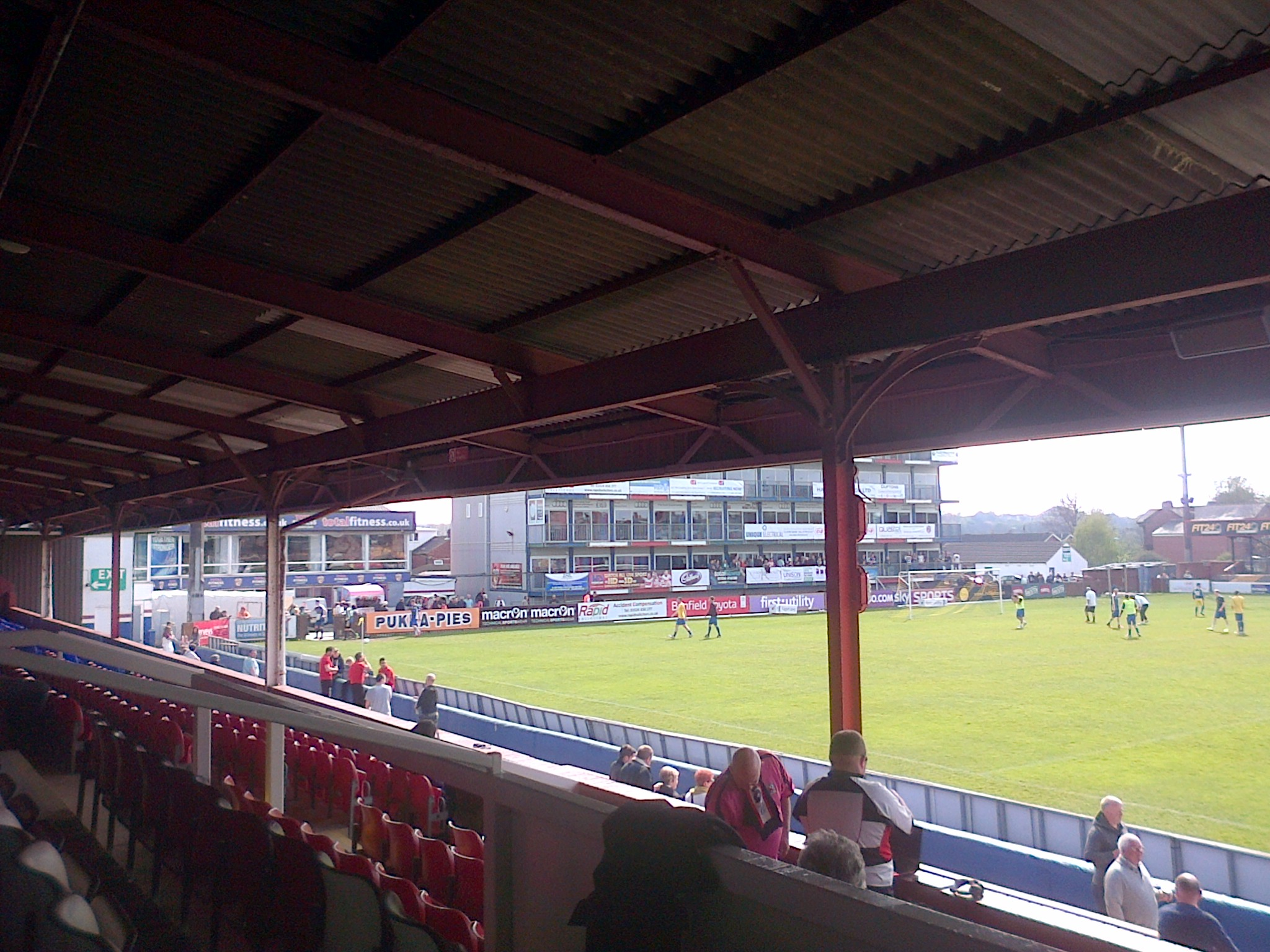
Belle Vue, Trinity Street End

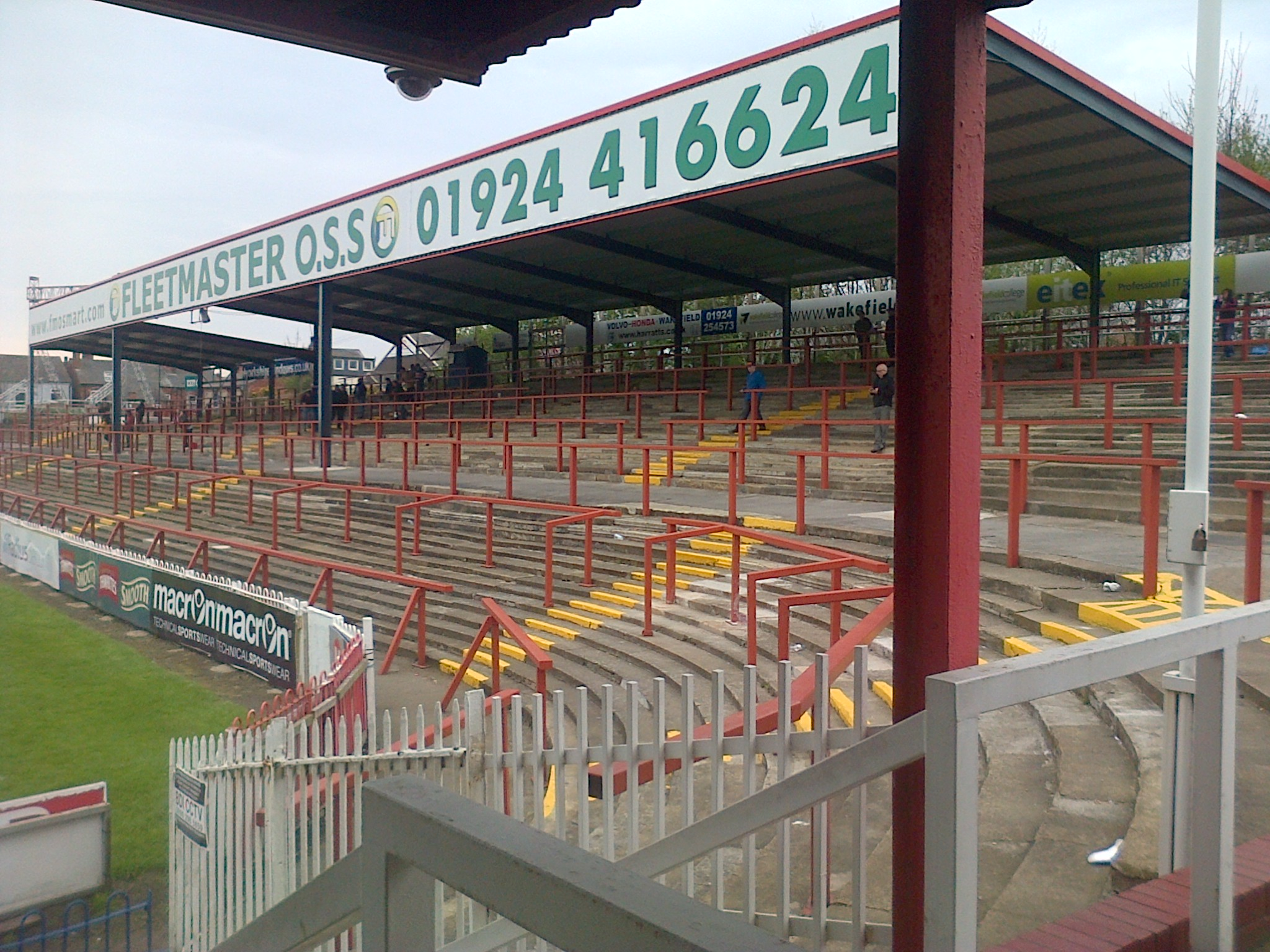
Belle Vue, Doncaster Road End

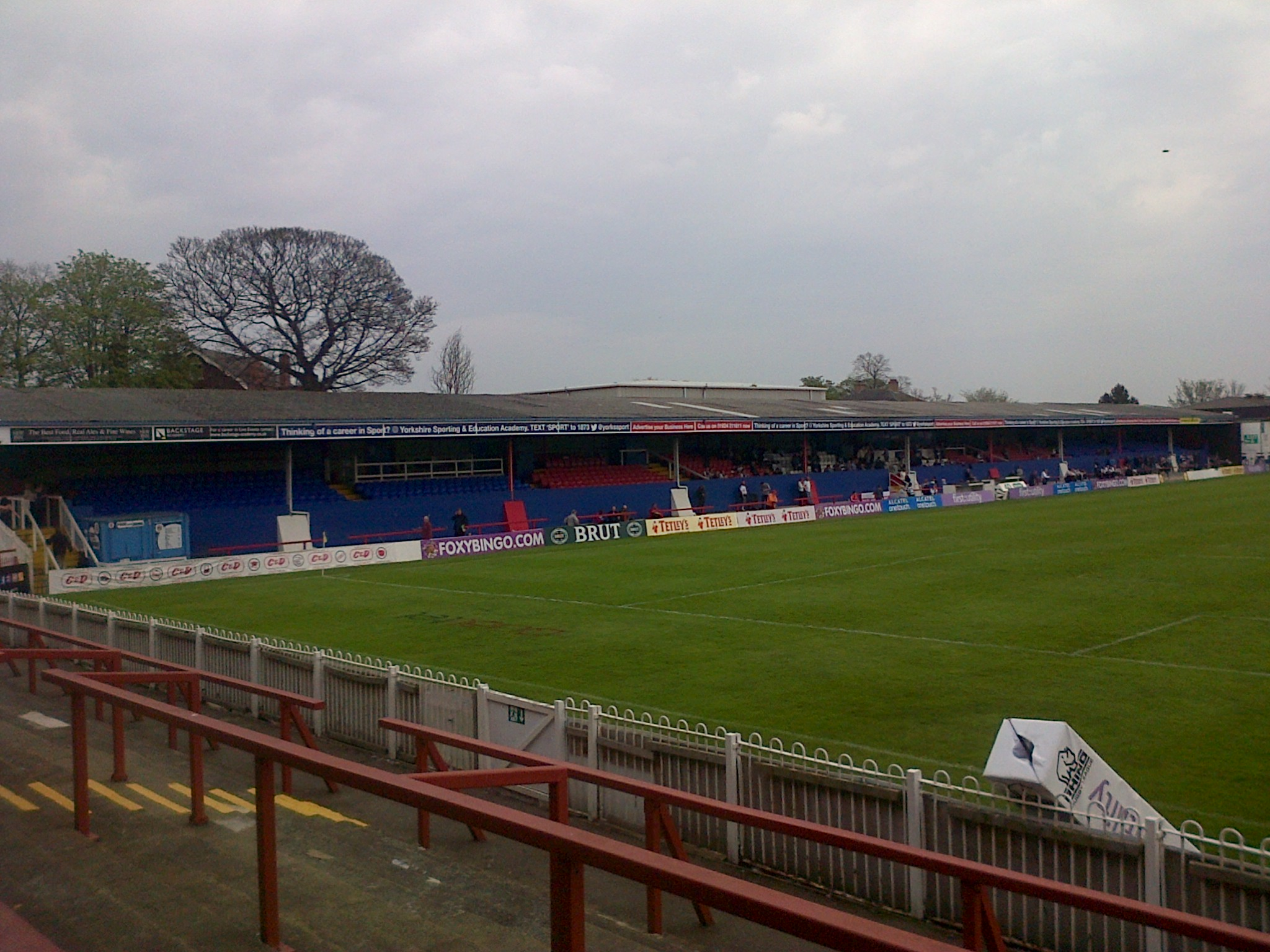
Belle Vue, East Stand

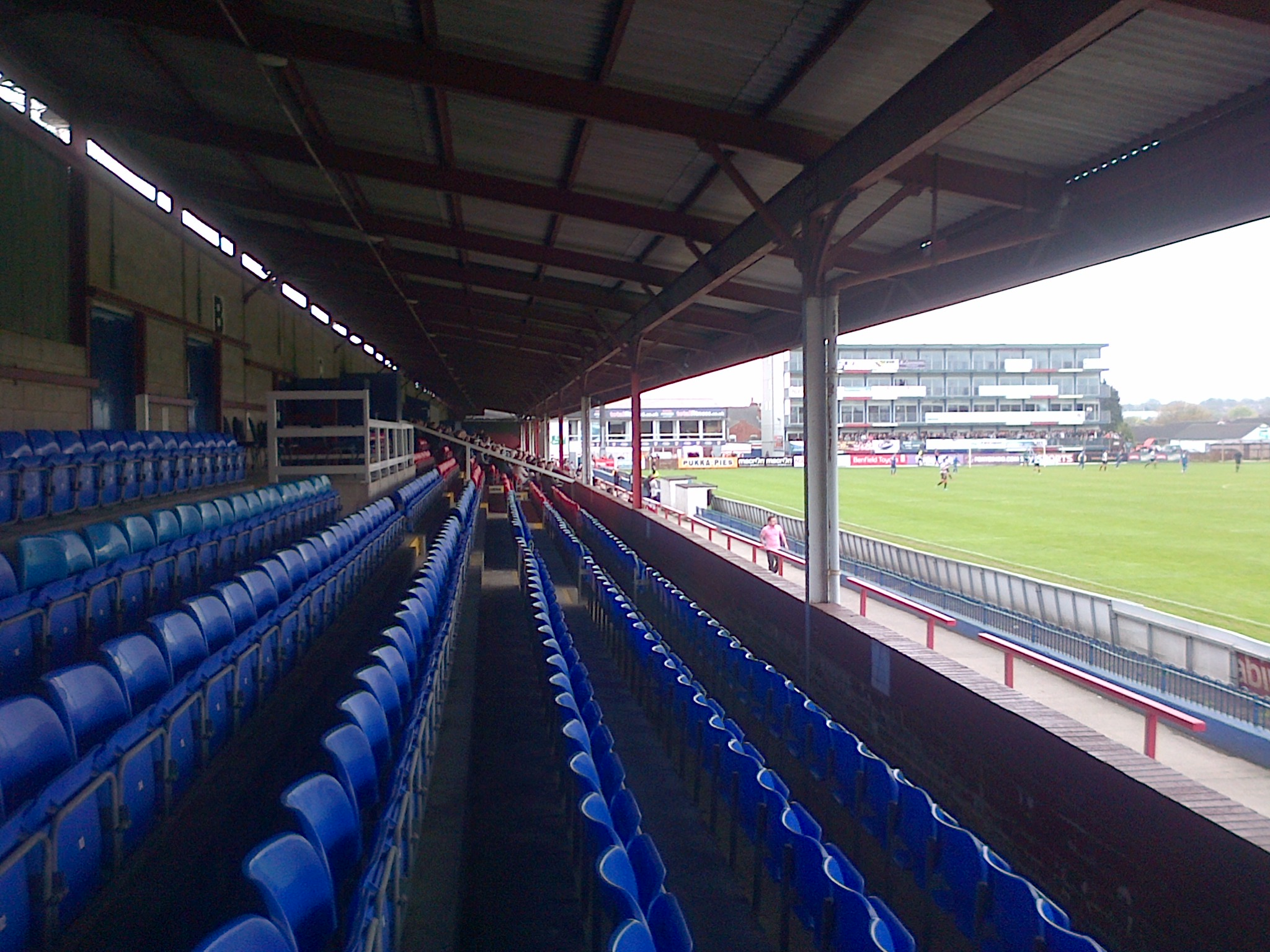
Belle Vue, Main Stand

In the following season Emley sustained their challenge for the league, but could only finish fifth. They again reached the Sheffield Cup Final and again lost to Doncaster Rovers at Hillsborough, this time 3–0. In the close season the club decided to rename itself Wakefield & Emley FC. This alienated most of the supporters from the village and surrounding areas as the club frequently began to be referred to as simply "Wakefield". 2003–04 saw Wakefield & Emley's worst ever season in senior football, they finished bottom of the Northern Premier League Premier Division. However, Emley remained in the Premier Division due to the re-organisation of the English football league system that saw the creation of the Conference North and South leagues.

The club changed its name once again in the 2004–05 season, this time to Wakefield–Emley. They finished mid-table this time. In the close season Northern Counties East League disbanded its reserve division. The Wakefield-Emley reserve team had continued in that division when the first team were promoted to the NPL. They also continued to play at the old Welfare Ground in Emley. After the reserve team, which continued to play in Emley was disbanded, members and supporters of the club from its Emley days formed AFC Emley in 2005 in order to keep football at the Welfare Ground in the village. Many fans reverted to following the new club back in Emley, after which, the Emley name and thus, the links to the original club were severed and Wakefield struggled to attract support from the city.

Wakefield–Emley continued at Belle-Vue, but they were relegated to the Northern Premier League First Division. As there was now a new club in Emley, the board decided to drop the name "Emley" and continued on as Wakefield F.C., the club changed colours and moved to College Grove in Wakefield, becoming fully a Wakefield club. In 2007, Wakefield played in the inaugural season of the Northern Premier League Division One North.

Paul Lines was appointed the new manager of Wakefield on 9 December 2011 and replaced general manager Mark Brier who was sacked earlier in week. He was joined in the dugout by Liam Sutcliffe as assistant manager.

Wakefield resigned from the Northern Premier League at the end of the 2013–14 season and had planned to participate in the Northern Counties East Football League in the 2014–15 season with a view to returning to The Welfare Ground, where they hoped to share with Emley. However the club informed the FA and the Northern Counties League on 21 June 2014 that they would not be competing in the forthcoming season ahead of the club being wound up.

A new Wakefield AFC was established in 2019.

== Records ==
- Best FA Cup performance: Third round, 1997–98
- Best FA Trophy performance: Quarter-finals, 1990–91, 1998–99
- Best FA Vase performance: Finalists, 1987–88

== See also ==
- Wakefield F.C. players
- Wakefield F.C. managers
- Wakefield A.F.C.
