= Tadcaster Albion A.F.C. =

Association football club in Tadcaster, England

Coordinates: 53°52′59.21″N 1°15′30.56″W

- Full name: Tadcaster Albion Association Football Club
- Nicknames: The Brewers; Albion; Taddy; Tad
- Founded: 1892 (as John Smith's)
- Ground: Ings Lane, Tadcaster
- Capacity: 2,000 Seats 459; Covered standing 150
- Chairman: Andy Charlesworth
- Manager: Ryan Qualter
- League: Northern Counties East League Premier Division
- 2025–26: Northern Counties East League Premier Division, 4th of 20
- Website: www.tadalbion.com
Home colours	Away colours

Tadcaster Albion Association Football Club is an association football club in Tadcaster, North Yorkshire, England. Formed in 1892, their ground is situated behind the John Smith's Brewery in Tadcaster, thus the reason for their nickname "The Brewers". They compete in the Northern Counties East League Premier Division.

== History ==
The club was formed in 1892 as John Smith's Football Club, the founders took this name as the location of their ground in Tadcaster is situated behind the John Smith's brewery. They have very old roots in the York Football League, records show that they played in it prior to 1909.

=== York League: early history ===
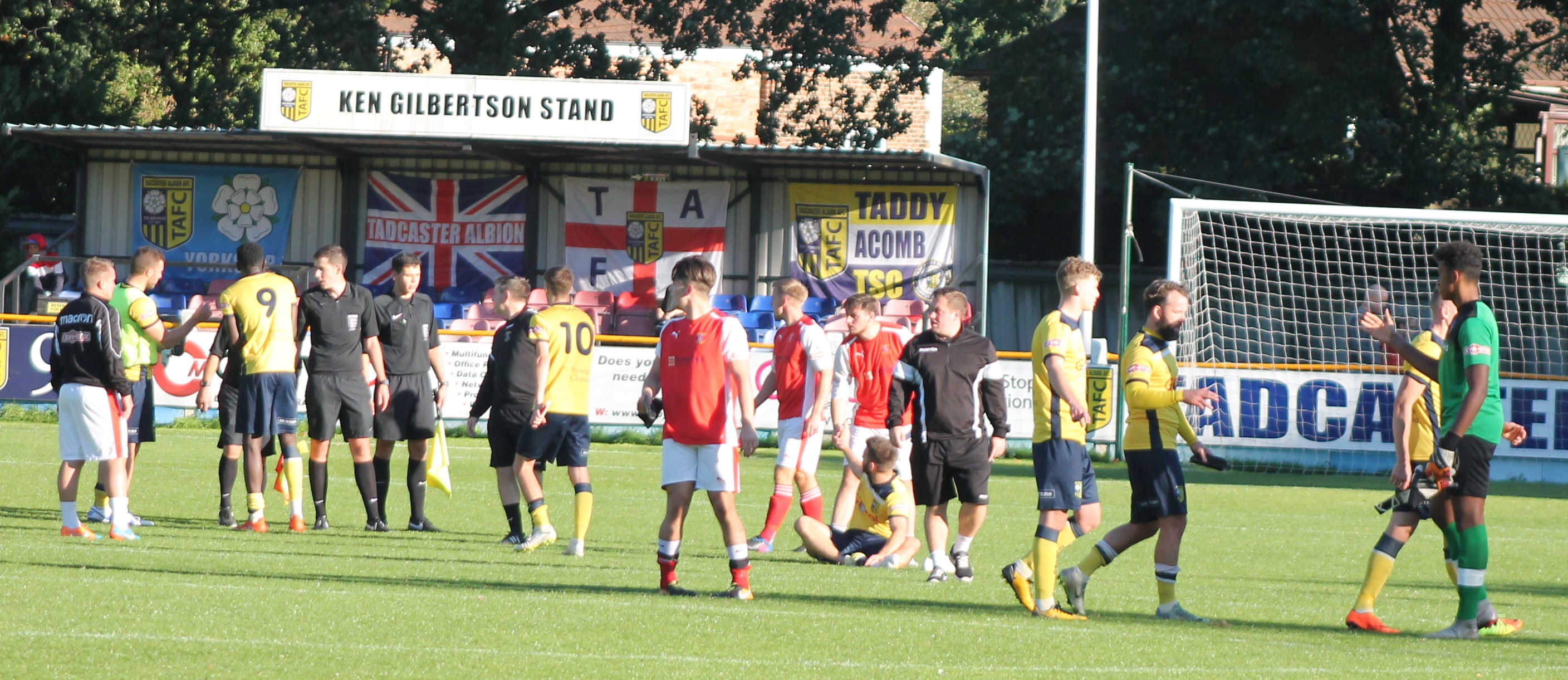
The Brewers in 2018

In the 1909–10 season John Smith's gained promotion from the old York League Division Two (today's equivalent is now called Division One) into the top level of the York League system, where they would compete against the likes of York City "A", Rowntrees, Heworth and others.

The club came into problems in the early 1920s, but in 1923 came back under the new name of Tadcaster Albion. The league committee placed them in the second-level division of the York League, which they won that season and were promoted.

By 1926–27, Tadcaster were back under the John Smith's name and were playing at the second level of the York League again; oddly, a second team was founded in 1930 under the name of Tadcaster Albion, they both played on the same field and even rose up the divisions together (Smith's won the second level championship in 1932–33). It is thought that this was in case one club went into trouble, then the other could continue on in a better league position. They both merged because of World War II and kept the Tadcaster Albion name, along with the nickname the Brewers.

Albion won the York Football League in 1947–48, beating out a competitive pack which included York Railway Institute (who would dominate largely in the following years). Despite winning the league, Tadcaster were not promoted and continued on through the 1950s.

=== Yorkshire League ===
Tadcaster joined the Yorkshire League Division Three in 1973–74. During their second season in the league, they were promoted to the Yorkshire League Division two, narrowly missing out on the runner-up spot on goal average.

The goal difference tables would be turned in favour of Albion during the 1976–77 season, when they were promoted to the Yorkshire League Division One on goal average. They had a very good cup run during the 1977–78 season, they reached the 5th round of the FA Vase. Relegations followed in 1979 and again in 1980.

=== Northern Counties East League ===
In 1982–83 they became a founding member of the Northern Counties East League, they remained in Northern Counties East Football League Division One for fifteen seasons. In 2009–10 they won the Northern Counties East Football League Division One League title. In 2010–11, they finished 4th in the Northern Counties East Football League Premier Division and won the NCEL President's Cup beating Farsley AFC 5–1 in the final.

In 2011–12 the club finished 8th and in 2012–13 finished 6th. In the autumn 2013–14, they led the NCEL Premier for the first time in their history, eventually finishing 3rd after having 4 points deducted for fielding an ineligible player. They achieved their then highest number of points in the NCEL with 93 points from 44 games. They also scored a record number of league goals for a season (116). At the start of 2015, Tadcaster Albion were top of the NCEL Premier. They were also still in the FA Vase, West Riding FA County Cup & the NCEL League Cup competitions.

In 2015 the club became embroiled in a pitch invasion after being knocked out of the FA Vase by Highworth Town, after it was claimed a Highworth fan had thrown coins and at full time had 'goaded' hard core Albion fans. Town's chairman and goalkeeper were injured in the melee.

The season petered out towards the end, with a final league position of 3rd and being knocked out in two semi final. Paul Marshall contract was not renewed and his managerial reign ended after a very successful 7 years.

Billy Miller was appointed the new manager on 20 May 2015 and with massive financial investment from the owners, Miller guided Albion to the NCEL Premier Division title in his first season in charge.

=== Northern Premier League ===
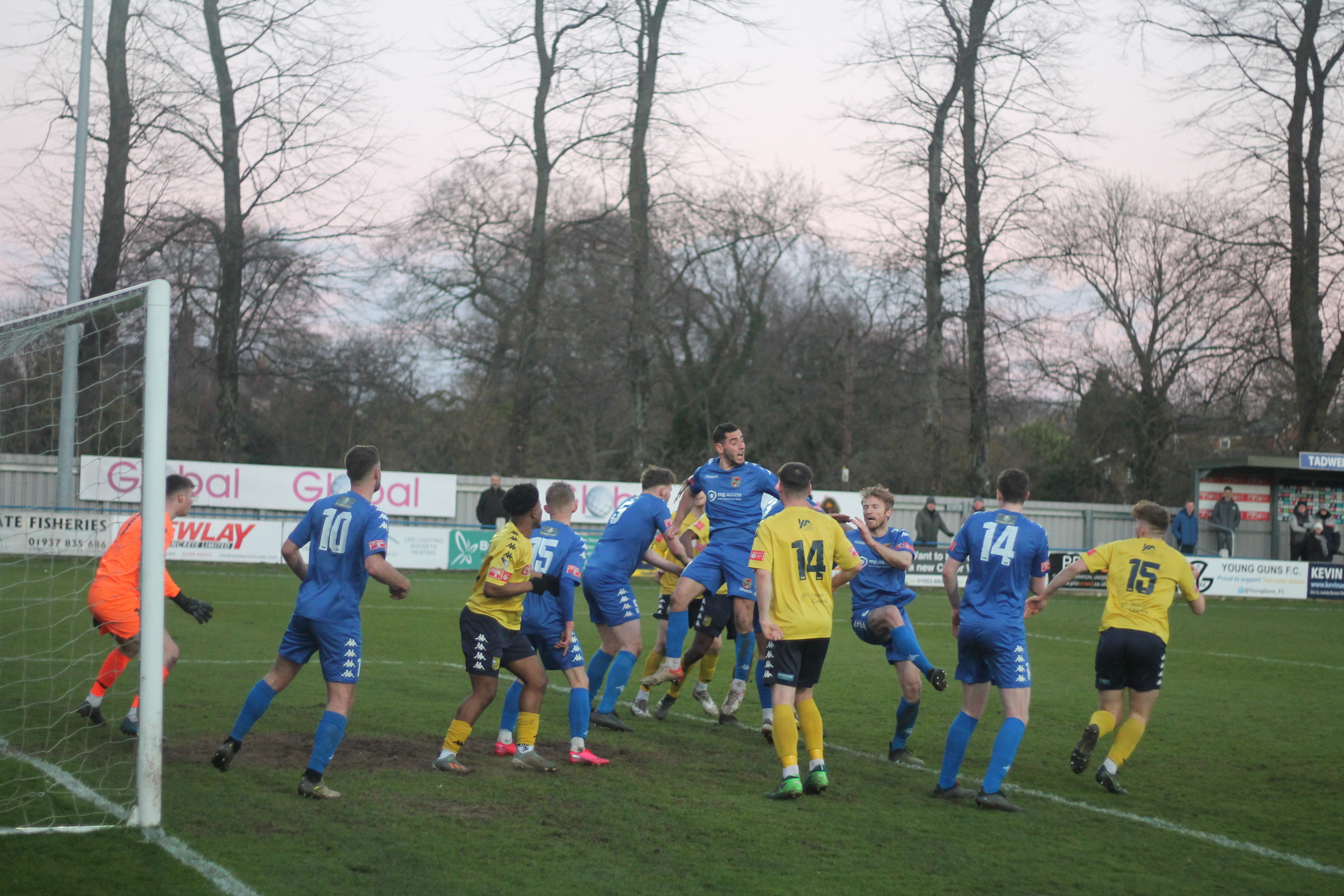
Tadcaster Albion take on Pontefract Collieries in the Northern Premier League in January 2022

In their first season, in the Northern Premier League Division One North, Albion finished 19th. Following a solid start to the campaign, the second half of the season was disappointing and lacklustre. As a result, Miller was replaced a couple of days short of 2 years in charge. Michael Morton and Simon Collins stepped up from managing the Under 21 team, to take charge of the first team. Their first task was to purge the squad getting rid of many of the players Miller brought in and bringing in some experienced / expensive replacements.

The club were relegated on 25 March 2023 having accumulated just eighteen points from thirty-three matches.

== Current squad ==
As of 3 February 2026.

Note: Flags indicate national team as defined under FIFA eligibility rules; some limited exceptions apply. Players may hold more than one non-FIFA nationality.

No.	Pos.	Nation	Player
—	GK	ENG	Alfie Burnett
—	GK	ENG	Ally Hughes
—	GK	ENG	Alfie Scales
—	GK	ENG	Joe Wild
—	DF	ENG	Ashton Peltier
—	DF	ENG	Joe Billet
—	DF	ENG	Nathan Heaton
—	DF	ENG	Callum Hudson
—	DF	ENG	Reece Kendall
—	DF	ENG	Mike Morris
—	DF	ENG	Charlie Owen
—	DF	ENG	George Pearson
—	DF	ENG	Aaron Pilkington
—	DF	ENG	Adam Porritt
—	DF	ENG	Curtis Senior
—	DF	ENG	Mason Wilson
—	MF	ENG	William Marshall
—	MF	ENG	Sam Kitchen
—	MF	ENG	Josh Byfield

No.	Pos.	Nation	Player
—	MF	CYP	Mitch Georgiou
—	MF	ENG	Alex Charlesworth
—	MF	ENG	Jayden Clarke-Thompson
—	MF	ENG	Spencer James-Harris
—	MF	KOS	Fatlum Ibrahimi
—	MF	ENG	Jack Lane
—	MF	ENG	Oliver Metcalfe
—	MF	ENG	Mathew Mulhearn
—	MF	ENG	Craig Nelthorpe
—	MF	CMR	Noel Nfonkeu
—	MF	ENG	Eoin Scofield
—	MF	ENG	Andrew Shepherd
—	MF	ENG	Noah Ward
—	MF	ENG	Bailey Wilson
—	FW	POR	Miguel Cassama
—	FW	ENG	Alexander Clark
—	FW	ENG	Oliver Green
—	FW	KOS	Albert Ibrahimi
—	FW	ENG	Luke Hinsley
—	FW	ENG	Oli Johnson
—	FW	POL	Grocjac Klimczak
—	FW	ENG	Oliver Norman
—	FW	NGR	Desmond Okoro
—	FW	ENG	Laurance Sordhaindo
—	FW	ENG	Charlie Thompson

== Honours ==
- Northern Counties East Football League Premier Division
  - League Champions: 2015–16
- Northern Counties East Football League Division One
  - League Champions: 2009–10
- Northern Counties East Football League Presidents Cup
  - Winners: 2010–11
- Yorkshire League Division Two
  - Runners-up: 1976–77
- Yorkshire League Division Three
  - Promoted: 1974–75
- York Football League
  - Champions: 1947–48
  - Runners-up: 1953–54
- York Football League Division One
  - Champions: 1909–10, 1923–24, 1932–33

== Records ==
- Highest Attendance: 1,307 v Highworth Town, FA Vase, 2014–15;
- Record Victory: 13–0 v Blidworth Welfare, NCEL Division One, 1997–98;
- Record Defeat: 10–2 v Thackley, 1984–85
- FA Cup: Third Qualifying Round 2012–13, knocked out by Boston Utd 2–0, 2020-21 knocked out by Darlington FC 6–1.
- FA Vase: Sixth Round: 2014–15, knocked out by Highworth Town 1–0.
