= Central Midlands Alliance League =

English football club

Central Midlands Alliance
- Founded: 1983
- Country: England
- Divisions: North Division; South Division; Division 1 (North, South, East, West); Division 2
- Number of clubs: 92; 17 (North Division); 18 (South Division); 10 (Division One North); 12 (Division One East); 12 (Division One West); 10 (Division One South); 13 (Division Two)
- Level on pyramid: Level 11 (North and South Divisions)
- Feeder to: Northern Counties East League; United Counties League
- Promotion to: Northern Counties East League Division One; United Counties League Division One
- Domestic cup: League Challenge Cup
- Current champions: Kinsley Boys (Premier North); Selston (Premier South)
- Most championships: Hucknall Town and Selston (3 times)
- Website: League website

The Central Midlands Alliance is an English football league covering the northeast-central part of England. Formed in 1971 as the South Derbyshire League, changing name initially to the Derbyshire League before changing to the Central Midlands League in 1983, it covers parts of Derbyshire, Lincolnshire, Nottinghamshire, South Yorkshire and Staffordshire, although Sheffield-based teams play in the Sheffield & Hallamshire County Senior Football League. The league's current sponsor is Abacus Lighting. Upon merging with the Midland Regional Alliance in 2023, the current name was adopted.

Within the English football league system, the Central Midlands League's top two divisions, called the North Division and South Division, were considered part of the National League System (at Step 7) until 2020, when they were redesignated as NLS county feeders. Four clubs from the previously-named Premier Division had the distinction of being the lowest-ranked clubs, and only ones outside the NLS, accepted for the 2006–07 FA Vase. For the 2008–09 season, eight of the leading sides left the Central Midlands League to join forces with eight clubs from the Leicestershire Senior League to form a new league, the East Midlands Counties League, at Step 6 of the National League System. For the 2015–16 season reserve teams of clubs who play higher up the pyramid were allowed to participate in the league for the first time.

One club per season from the North and South Divisions may be promoted (subject to ground standards and a top five finish) to either the Northern Counties East League Division One or United Counties League Division One. Some clubs have progressed from the CML to the National League North and Northern Premier League. A representative side from the league takes part in the FA Inter-League Cup.

== Divisions ==
The number of divisions has varied over time as follows

- 1983–84: Premier, Premier First, Senior and First
- 1984–85 to 1985–86: Premier, Central, Senior and First
- 1986–87 to 1987–88: Supreme, Premier, First and Second
- 1988–89 to 1990–91: Supreme, Premier and First
- 1991–92: Supreme, Premier North and Premier South
- 1992–93 to 2010–11: Supreme and Premier
- 2011–12 to 2012–13: North and South
- 2012–13 to 2014–15: North, South, Reserve Supreme and Reserve Premier
- 2015–16 to 2016–17: North, South, Reserve Division
- 2017–18 to 2018–19: North, South, Reserve Supreme and Division One
- 2018–19 to 2019–20: North, South, Division One North and South
- 2019–20 to 2021–22: North, South, Division One North, South and Central
- 2022–23: North, South, Division One North, East and West
- 2023–24 onwards: North, South, Division One North, South, East and West and Division 2

== Current members ==
The member clubs of the league for the 2026–27 season are as follows.

=== Camper UK Premier Division North ===
- AFC Bentley
- A.F.C. Phoenix
- Brodsworth Main
- Burngreave United
- Dinnington Town
- Elite AFC
- Evo Soccer
- Glapwell
- Harworth Colliery
- Ollerton Town
- RHP Sports and Social
- Rossington
- Rossington Main Reserves
- St Josephs Rockware of Worksop
- Staveley Miners Welfare Reserves
- Teversal
- Worksop Town reserves

=== Camper UK Premier Division South ===
- Bakewell Town
- Blidworth Welfare
- Borrowash Victoria
- Cromford & Wirksworth Town
- Derby Gazers
- Derby Singh Brothers
- FC Sunnyhill
- Graham Street Prims
- Gresley Rovers B
- Holbrook Sports
- Holbrook St Michaels
- Linby Colliery Welfare
- Melbourne Dynamo
- Mickleover Athletic
- Mickleover Royal British Legion
- Ripley Town
- Wirksworth Ivanhoe

=== Macron Store Nottingham Division One North ===
- AFC Bentley Development
- AFC Manton
- Appleby Frodingham Saints
- Armthorpe Welfare Reserves
- Brodsworth Main Reserves
- Dunscroft United
- Frickley Athletic Reserves
- Harworth Colliery Reserves
- Kinsley Boys Development
- Kirton Brickworks
- Long Bennington
- Rossington Development
- Team 780

=== Macron Store Nottingham Division One Central ===
- AFC Normanton
- Belper United Development
- Eastwood & Kimberley
- Eastwood Development
- G3A
- Heanor Town Reserves
- Holbrook Sports Development
- Inter Belper
- Linby Colliery Welfare Reserves
- Punjab United
- Rowsley '86
- Sleetmoor United
- Teversal Reserves
- Willow Wanderers
- Wirksworth Ivanhoe Reserves

=== Macron Store Nottingham Division One South ===
- Baobab United
- Burton Hornets
- Burton United
- Castle Donington
- Hemington Hammers
- Ingles Reserves
- Little Eaton
- Markeaton
- Mayfield
- Melbourne Dynamo Reserves
- Mickleover Royal British Legion Reserves
- Rising Stars
- Stockbrook United

=== Drayton PACS Division Two ===
- Aston Village
- Bakewell Town Development
- Bargate Rovers
- Castle Donington Reserves
- Cromford & Wirksworth Town Development
- Duffield Dynamo
- Little Eaton Reserves
- Mickleover Athletic Reserves
- Punjab United Reserves
- Ripley Town Reserves
- Rowsley '86 Reserves

== League champions ==
Season	Premier Division
1983–84	Shepshed Charterhouse reserves
1984–85	Rossington Main
1985–86	Stanton

Season	Supreme Division	Premier Division
1986–87	Hinckley Town	Stanton
1987–88	Harworth Colliery Institute	Huthwaite
1988–89	Boston	Priory
1989–90	Hucknall Town	Mickleover Royal British Legion
1990–91	Hucknall Town	Mickleover Royal British Legion
1991–92	Lincoln United	North Fryston Colliery Welfare; South Slack & Parr
1992–93	Arnold Town	Sandiacre Town
1993–94	Glapwell	Nuthall
1994–95	Heanor Town	Clipstone Welfare
1995–96	Oakham United	Killamarsh Juniors
1996–97	Heanor Town	Clipstone Welfare
1997–98	Gedling Town	Goole AFC
1998–99	Mickleover Sports	Lincoln Moorlands
1999–00	Lincoln Moorlands	Holbrook
2000–01	Shirebrook Town	North Notts
2001–02	Shirebrook Town	Retford United
2002–03	Carlton Town	Pelican
2003–04	Retford United	Radcliffe Olympic
2004–05	Dunkirk	AFC Barnsley
2005–06	Barton Town Old Boys	Bilborough Pelican
2006–07	Bottesford Town	Hatfield Main
2007–08	Askern Welfare	Ollerton Town
2008–09	Radcliffe Olympic	Louth Town
2009–10	Louth Town	Church Warsop
2010–11	Sheffield Parramore	Yorkshire Main

Season	North Division	South Division
2011–12	Westella & Willerby	Basford United
2012–13	Dronfield Town	Sutton Town
2013–14	AFC Mansfield	Clifton All Whites
2014–15	Bilsthorpe	Mickleover Royals
2015–16	Glapwell	Selston
2016–17	FC Bolsover	Selston
2017–18	Harworth Colliery	Eastwood
2018–19	Retford	Hucknall Town
2019–20	Season abandoned owing to COVID-19 pandemic	
2020–21	Season curtailed	
2021–22	Newark Town	Blidworth Welfare
2022–23	Retford United	Clay Cross Town
2023-24	Dearne and District	Pinxton
2024-25	Doncaster City	South Normanton Athletic
2025-26	Kinsley Boys	Selston

== League Challenge Cup ==
The league also runs the Central Midlands League Challenge Cup, which is contested by every club in the league. Since 2001 every final has been played at Alfreton Town's North Street stadium.

=== Finals ===
Season	Winner	Result	Runner-up	Venue
2000–01	Shirebrook Town	1 – 0	Collingham	North Street
2001–02	Retford United	1 – 0	Thorne Colliery	North Street
2002–03	Dinnington Town	2 – 0	Dunkirk	North Street
2003–04	Retford United	1 – 0	Dinnington Town	North Street
2004–05	Sandiacre Town	1 – 0	Dunkirk	North Street
2005–06	Dinnington Town	2 – 1	Askern Welfare	North Street
2006–07	Heanor Town	5 – 3	Ollerton Town	North Street
2007–08	Dunkirk	1 – 0	Blidworth Welfare	North Street
2008–09	Sutton Town	2 – 0	Westella & Willerby	North Street
2009–10	Newark Town	4 – 4(p)	Louth Town	North Street
2010–11	Yorkshire Main	2 – 2(p)	Kirkby Town	North Street
2011–12	Dronfield Town	5 – 2	Clifton All Whites	North Street
2012–13	Clifton All Whites	1 – 0	AFC Mansfield	North Street
2013–14	AFC Mansfield	2 – 1	Thorne Colliery	North Street
2014–15	Hucknall Town	3 – 0	Clifton All Whites	North Street
2015–16	Hucknall Rolls Leisure	2 – 1	Blidworth Welfare	North Street
2016–17	Selston	2 – 0	Hucknall Town	North Street
2017–18	Pinxton	4 – 3	Collingham	North Street
2018–19	Pinxton	4 – 4(p)	Hucknall Town	North Street
2019-20	Season abandoned owing to COVID-19 pandemic			
2020–21	Season curtailed			
2021–22	Linby Colliery Welfare	1 – 1(p)	Mickleover Royal British Legion	North Street
2022–23	Mickleover Royal British Legion	4 – 2	Clay Cross Town	North Street
2023–24	Doncaster City	2 – 0	Dinnington Town	North Street
2024–25	Dinnington Town	2 – 1	Doncaster City	North Street
