= York Railway Institute A.F.C. =

York Railway Institute
- Full name: York Railway Institute Association Football Club
- Founded: 1929
- League: York League Division Three
- 2024–25: York League Division Four, 6th of 9

York Railway Institute Association Football Club is an English association football club from York, North Yorkshire. They are currently members of the York League Division Three.

== History ==
The club was founded in 1929. In 1974 they joined the Yorkshire League, and won the Division Three title in 1979. In 1982 they became founder members of the Northern Counties East Football League, and in 1988 they won a Division One and League Cup double. They played in the FA Vase throughout the early 1980s.

They left the NCEL in 1992, and later played in the West Yorkshire League, before joining the York Football League.

== Honours ==
- Northern Counties East League Division One
  - Champions: 1987–88
- Northern Counties East League Cup
  - Champions: 1987–88

North riding county cup winners 1984
