= 2007–08 Lincoln City F.C. season =

Lincoln City F.C.
2007–08 season
- Chairman: Steff Wright
- Manager: Peter Jackson
- Stadium: Sincil Bank
- Football League Two: 15th
- FA Cup: First round
- League Cup: First round
- League Trophy: Second round
- Top goalscorer: Ben Wright (15)
- Highest home attendance: 7,361 vs Nottingham Forest, FA Cup, 10 November 2007
- Lowest home attendance: 936 vs Hartlepool United, League Trophy, 9 October 2007
colours	colours

During the 2007–08 season Lincoln City F.C. played in Football League Two after finishing last season in fifth place in the Football League Two and losing another play-off semi-final the previous season. It marked Lincoln's 101st season in the Football League, becoming one of only 26 clubs to have completed 100 or more seasons since the league's formation in 1888. The club are the first club to have reached the milestone without playing top-flight football. This season marked the club's 79th season in the lowest possible division in the Football League, and the 36th season in the fourth tier of English football. The club have now been competing in the fourth tier for nine successive seasons, with their last season in a higher division coming in 1998–99.

== Contract expiry dates ==
Summer 2008
#	Player	Place of birth	Age	Signed from	Date joined
1	(England) Alan Marriott	Bedford	29	Tottenham Hotspur	August 1999
3	(England) Gary Croft	Burton on Trent	33	Grimsby Town	July 2007
4	(England) Adie Moses	Doncaster	32	Crewe Alexandra	July 2006
8	(England) Jamie Forrester	Bradford	33	Bristol Rovers	March 2006
9	(England) Mark Stallard	Derby	33	Shrewsbury Town	July 2006
11	(England) Scott Kerr	Leeds	26	Scarborough	July 2005
13	(England) Ayden Duffy	Kettering	21	Lincoln City F.C. Youth Academy	Professional terms – July 2006
23	(England) Shane Clarke	Lincoln	20	Lincoln City F.C. Youth Academy	Professional terms – July 2006

Summer 2009
#	Player	Place of birth	Age	Signed from	Date joined
2	(England) Paul Green	Birmingham	21	Aston Villa	January 2007
5	(Wales) Lee Beevers	Doncaster	24	Boston United	February 2005
6	(England) Nat Brown	Sheffield	26	Huddersfield Town	July 2005
14	(England) Ryan Amoo	Leicester	24	Barrow Town	July 2006
15	(England) Ben Wright	Munster	27	IK Start	August 2007
17	(France) Dany N'Guessan	Ivry-Sur-Seine	20	Rangers	January 2007
20	(Wales) Owain Warlow	Trefforest	19	Lincoln City F.C. Youth Academy	Professional terms – July 2006
26	(England) Jamie Hand	Uxbridge	23	Chester City	August 2007

Summer 2010
#	Player	Place of birth	Age	Signed from	Date joined
27	(England) Danny Hone	Farnborough	18	Lincoln City F.C. Youth Academy	Professional terms – December 2007
29	(England) Lenell John-Lewis	London	18	Lincoln City F.C. Youth Academy	Professional terms – December 2007

Summer 2011
#	Player	Place of birth	Age	Signed from	Date joined
7	(Republic of Ireland) Lee Frecklington	Lincoln	22	Lincoln City F.C. Youth Academy	Professional terms – May 2005

== Squad ==
No.	Pos	Nat	Player	Total		League Two		FA Cup		League Cup		League Trophy	
No.	Pos	Nat	Player	Apps	Goals	Apps	Goals	Apps	Goals	Apps	Goals	Apps	Goals
1	GK	(England) ENG	Alan Marriott	38	0	34	0	2	0	1	0	1	0
2	DF	(England) ENG	Paul Green	40	1	36	1	2	0	1	0	1	0
3	DF	(England) ENG	Gary Croft	22	0	20	0	2	0	0	0	0	0
4	DF	(England) ENG	Adie Moses	21	0	18	0	2	0	1	0	0	0
5	DF	(Wales) WAL	Lee Beevers	38	1	37	1	0	0	0	0	1	0
6	DF	(England) ENG	Nat Brown	28	0	27	0	0	0	1	0	0	0
7	MF	(Republic of Ireland) IRL	Lee Frecklington	38	4	34	4	2	0	1	0	1	0
8	FW	(England) ENG	Jamie Forrester	44	14	40	12	2	1	1	1	1	0
9	FW	(England) ENG	Mark Stallard	26	4	24	2	0	0	1	0	1	2
10	FW	(England) ENG	Steve Torpey [contract cancelled – 7 January 2008]	14	0	13	0	0	0	1	0	0	0
11	MF	(England) ENG	Scott Kerr	40	1	36	1	2	0	1	0	1	0
13	GK	(England) ENG	Ayden Duffy	4	0	4	0	0	0	0	0	0	0
14	MF	(England) ENG	Ryan Amoo	16	1	13	1	1	0	1	0	1	0
15	FW	(England) ENG	Ben Wright	38	15	34	15	2	0	1	0	1	0
16	MF	(England) ENG	Ryan Semple [contract cancelled – 31 January 2008]	0	0	0	0	0	0	0	0	0	0
16	MF	(Cameroon) CMR	Alex Morfaw [on loan from Scunthorpe United F.C.]	0	0	0	0	0	0	0	0	0	0
17	MF	(France) FRA	Dany N'Guessan	40	7	36	7	2	0	1	0	1	0
18	FW	(England) ENG	Ollie Ryan [contract cancelled – 20 March 2008]	15	0	14	0	0	0	0	0	1	0
19	MF	(England) ENG	Louis Dodds [on loan from Leicester City F.C.]	44	9	41	9	2	0	1	0	0	0
20	MF	(Wales) WAL	Owain Warlow	21	0	17	0	2	0	1	0	1	0
21	DF	(England) ENG	Phil Watt [contract cancelled – 25 February 2008]	2	0	1	0	1	0	0	0	0	0
21	FW	(England) ENG	Gary King	6	1	6	1	0	0	0	0	0	0
22	MF	(Republic of Ireland) IRL	Michael Roddy [contract expired – 2 January 2008]	0	0	0	0	0	0	0	0	0	0
22	FW	(England) ENG	Adam Smith [returned to Chesterfield F.C.]	4	0	4	0	0	0	0	0	0	0
23	MF	(England) ENG	Shane Clarke	16	0	16	0	0	0	0	0	0	0
24	DF	(England) ENG	Jack Cotton [contract cancelled – 14 February 2008]	0	0	0	0	0	0	0	0	0	0
25	DF	(Algeria) ALG	Hamza Bencherif [returned to Nottingham Forest F.C.]	13	1	12	1	0	0	0	0	1	0
25	MF	(England) ENG	Martin Pembleton	6	0	6	0	0	0	0	0	0	0
26	MF	(England) ENG	Jamie Hand [on loan at Oxford United F.C.]	26	0	25	0	0	0	0	0	1	0
27	DF	(England) ENG	Daniel Hone	25	1	23	1	2	0	0	0	0	0
28	GK	(England) ENG	Ben Smith [returned to Doncaster Rovers F.C.]	9	0	9	0	0	0	0	0	0	0
29	FW	(England) ENG	Lenell John-Lewis	22	3	21	3	1	0	0	0	0	0
30	DF	(England) ENG	Lee Ridley [on loan from Cheltenham Town F.C.]	15	0	15	0	0	0	0	0	0	0

== Transfers ==
=== Ins ===
Summer 2007

#	Player	From	Age	Fee
03	(England) Gary Croft	Grimsby Town	33	Free transfer
10	(England) Steve Torpey	Scunthorpe United	37	Free transfer
15	(England) Ben Wright	IK Start	27	Free transfer
21	(England) Phil Watt	Lincoln City F.C. Youth Academy	19	First team debut
22	(Republic of Ireland) Michael Roddy	Bolton Wanderers	19	Free transfer
23	(England) Shane Clarke	Lincoln City F.C. Youth Academy	21	First team debut
26	(England) Jamie Hand	Chester City	–	Undisclosed fee
27	(England) Danny Hone	Lincoln City F.C. Youth Academy	18	Professional contract
29	(England) Lenell John-Lewis	Lincoln City F.C. Youth Academy	18	Professional contract

Loans

#	Player	From	Age
16	(Cameroon) Alex Morfaw	Scunthorpe United	20
19	(England) Louis Dodds	Leicester City	21
22	(England) Adam Smith	Chesterfield	22
25	(Algeria) Hamza Bencherif	Nottingham Forest	19
28	(England) Ben Smith	Doncaster Rovers	21
30	(England) Lee Ridley	Cheltenham Town	26

=== Outs ===
Summer 2007

Player	To	Age	Fee
(Northern Ireland) Jeff Hughes	Crystal Palace	22	£350,000
(Northern Ireland) Paul Morgan	Bury	29	Transfer request
(Scotland) Martin Gritton	Macclesfield Town	29	Free transfer
(Canada) Simon Rayner	Torquay United	24	Free transfer
(England) Leon Mettam	–	21	Free Transfer
(England) Andy Toyne	–	–	Free Transfer
(England) Tom Wilkinson	–	–	Retired
(England) Paul Mayo	Notts County	26	Free transfer

January 2008

Player	To	Age	Fee
(Republic of Ireland) Michael Roddy	–	19	Contract Expired – 02/01/08
(England) Steve Torpey	Farsley Celtic	37	Contract Cancelled – 07/01/08
(England) Ryan Semple	–	22	Contract Cancelled – 31/01/08
(England) Ben Smith	Doncaster Rovers	21	Recalled – 10/01/08
(England) Phil Watt	–	20	Contract Cancelled – 25/02/08
(England) Jack Cotton	–	–	Contract Cancelled – 14/02/08

== Competitions ==
=== Results summary ===
Overall								Home						Away					
Pld	W	D	L	GF	GA	GD	Pts	W	D	L	GF	GA	GD	W	D	L	GF	GA	GD
46	18	4	24	61	77	−16	58	9	3	11	33	38	−5	9	1	13	28	39	−11

Last updated: 3 May.
Source: BBC Sport

=== Results by round ===
Round	1	2	3	4	5	6	7	8	9	10	11	12	13	14	15	16	17	18	19	20	21	22	23	24	25	26	27	28	29	30	31	32	33	34	35	36	37	38	39	40	41	42	43	44	45	46
Ground	H	A	H	A	H	A	H	A	A	H	A	H	A	H	H	A	H	A	A	H	H	A	A	H	A	H	H	H	A	A	H	A	H	A	H	A	A	H	A	H	A	H	A	H	A	H
Result	L	W	W	L	L	L	L	L	D	D	L	D	L	L	L	L	W	W	L	W	L	L	L	D	W	L	W	L	W	W	W	W	W	L	W	L	W	L	L	W	L	L	W	W	W	L

Updated to match(es) played on 3 May. Source: BBC Sport
A = Away; H = Home; W = Win; D = Draw; L = Loss

Home Results

Match	1	2	3	4	5	6	7	8	9	10	11	12	13	14	15	16	17	18	19	20	21	22	23
Result	L	W	L	L	D	D	L	L	W	W	L	D	L	W	L	W	W	W	L	W	L	W	L

Updated to match(es) played on 3 May. Source: BBC Sport
W = Win; D = Draw; L = Loss

Away Results

Match	1	2	3	4	5	6	7	8	9	10	11	12	13	14	15	16	17	18	19	20	21	22	23
Result	W	L	L	L	D	L	L	L	W	L	L	L	W	W	W	W	L	L	W	L	L	W	W

Updated to match(es) played on 26 April. Source: BBC Sport
W = Win; D = Draw; L = Loss

== Fixtures and results ==
=== Friendlies ===
Date	Opponent	Venue	Result	Score F–A	Attendance	Scorers
18 Jul	Retford United (NPL Division One (South))	A	L	0–3	–	–
20 Jul	Grantham Town (NPL Division One (South))	A	W	4–2	–	Forrester (2), N'Guessan, Ryan
22 Jul	Genêts d'Anglet (CFA Group D)	A	W	2–1	approx. 300	Forrester, Frecklington
24 Jul	Pau FC (Championnat National)	A	W	1–0	–	Torpey
26 Jul	Sleaford Town (UCL Premier Division)	A	W	2–1	–	Watt, John-Lewis
28 Jul	Boston United (Conference North)	A	W	1–0	–	Brown
4 Aug	Horncastle Town (Lincolnshire Football League)	A	W	2–1	–	John-Lewis, King
5 Aug	Watford (Championship)	H	L	1–2	1,239	Ryan

=== League Two ===
Date	Opponent	Venue	Result	Score F–A	Attendance	Away Fans	Home Fans	Scorers
11 Aug	Shrewsbury Town	H	L	0–4	3,893	375	3,518	
18 Aug	Mansfield Town	A	W	3–1	3,357	620	–	Dodds, O.G, Stallard
25 Aug	Accrington Stanley	H	W	2–0	3,189	105	3,084	N'Guessan, Dodds
1 Sep	Dagenham & Redbridge	A	L	0–1	2,060	468	–	
7 Sep	Bradford City	H	L	1–2	5,286	1,064	4,222	Dodds
15 Sep	Darlington	A	L	0–2	4,075	412	–	
22 Sep	Grimsby Town	H	L	1–2	4,428	1,124	3,304	Forrester
29 Sep	Wrexham	A	L	0–1	3,614	179	–	
2 Oct	Bury	A	D	1–1	1,690	175	–	Kerr
6 Oct	Morecambe	H	D	1–1	3,281	187	3,094	Amoo
14 Oct	Milton Keynes Dons	A	L	0–4	13,037	403	–	
20 Oct	Peterborough United	H	D	1–1	5,036	1,725	3,311	Wright
27 Oct	Brentford	A	L	0–1	4,368	465	–	
2 Nov	Chester City	H	L	0–1	3,960	151	3,809	
6 Nov	Chesterfield	H	L	2–4	3,893	924	2,969	N'Guessan, Bencherif
17 Nov	Wycombe Wanderers	A	L	0–1	4,297	288	–	
24 Nov	Notts County	H	W	2–1	4,543	1,060	3,483	Wright, Frecklington
4 Dec	Stockport County	A	W	3–1	5,260	191	–	Wright (2), John-Lewis
8 Dec	Hereford United	A	L	1–3	2,528	209	–	Frecklington
15 Dec	Barnet	H	W	4–1	3,549	155	3,394	Wright (2), Forrester, Dodds
22 Dec	Darlington	H	L	0–4	4,025	375	3,650	
26 Dec	Bradford City	A	L	1–2	15,510	740	–	John-Lewis
29 Dec	Grimsby Town	A	L	0–1	5,533	969	–	
1 Jan	Bury	H	D	1–1	3,327	114	3,213	Dodds
5 Jan	Rochdale	A	W	2–0	2,721	263	–	Forrester, Frecklington
12 Jan	Rotherham United	H	L	1–3	5,016	1,482	3,534	Forrester
26 Jan	Dagenham & Redbridge	H	W	2–0	3,779	191	3,588	Wright, N'Guessan
29 Jan	Mansfield Town	H	L	1–2	4,280	734	3,546	Forrester
2 Feb	Shrewsbury Town	A	W	2–1	4,892	268	–	Dodds (2)
5 Feb	Macclesfield Town	A	W	2–1	1,576	202	–	N'Guessan, Forrester
9 Feb	Rochdale	H	W	2–1	3,955	468	3,487	Forrester, Hone
12 Feb	Accrington Stanley	A	W	3–0	1,281	209	–	Stallard, Wright, Beevers
16 Feb	Macclesfield Town	H	W	3–1	3,682	121	3,561	John-Lewis, Forrester, N'Guessan
23 Feb	Rotherham United	A	L	2–3	4,321	907	–	Dodds, Wright
1 Mar	Wycombe Wanderers	H	W	1–0	4,002	333	3,669	Dodds
7 Mar	Chesterfield	A	L	1–4	4,353	685	–	Wright
11 Mar	Notts County	A	W	1–0	3,858	870	–	Forrester
15 Mar	Stockport County	H	L	0–1	4,544	819	3,725	
22 Mar	Barnet	A	L	2–5	2,115	393	–	Wright (2)
24 Mar	Hereford United	H	W	2–1	3,614	381	3,233	N'Guessan (2)
29 Mar	Peterborough United	A	L	0–4	8,035	1,007	–	
4 Apr	Milton Keynes Dons	H	L	1–2	3,896	528	3,368	Wright
12 Apr	Chester City	A	W	2–1	2,089	205	–	Forrester (2)
19 Apr	Brentford	H	W	3–1	3,699	376	3,323	King, Forrester, Frecklington
26 Apr	Morecambe	A	W	2–1	2,762	501	–	Wright, Green
3 May	Wrexham	H	L	2–4	4,958	597	4,361	O.G, Wright

2007/08 Away Total: 10,629 (23 games)
2007/08 Away Average: 462
2007/08 Home Average: 93,835 (23 games) | 4,080
2007/08 Home Average (Excluding Away Fans): 4,080 – (582) = 3,498

=== FA Cup ===
Date	Round	Opponent	Venue	Result	Score F–A	Attendance	Away Fans	Home Fans	Scorers
10 Nov	One	Nottingham Forest	H	D	1–1	7,361	2,491	4,870	O.G
27 Nov	One (Replay)	Nottingham Forest	A	L	1–3	6,783	2,229	–	Forrester

=== League Cup ===
Date	Round	Opponent	Venue	Result	Score F–A	Attendance	Away Fans	Home Fans	Scorers
14 Aug	One (North)	Doncaster Rovers	A	L	1–4	5,084	792	–	Forrester

=== League Trophy 2007–08 ===
Date	Round	Opponent	Venue	Result	Score F–A	Attendance	Away Fans	Home Fans	Scorers
–	One (North)	Bye Received							
9 Oct	Two (North)	Hartlepool United	H	L	2–5	936	93	843	Stallard (2)

=== Fred Green Memorial Trophy ===
Date	Round	Opponent	Venue	Result	Score F–A	Score F–A	Attendance	Scorers
19 Jul	Final	Lincoln United	A	W	2–1	–	McCarthy, Ryan	

=== Lincolnshire Senior Cup ===
Date	Round	Opponent	Venue	Result	Score F–A	Attendance	Scorers
1 Aug	Final	Scunthorpe United	H	W	1–0	759	Forrester

== Head To Head ==
Team	Miles [One Way]	Home Result	Fans Brought	Away Result	Fans Took	Points Gained
Mansfield Town	34.8	1–2	734 [Tuesday]	3–1	620	3
Notts County	36.0	2–1	1,060	1–0	870 [Tuesday]	6
Grimsby Town	39.3	1–2	1,124	0–1	969	0
Chesterfield	43.3	2–4	924 [Tuesday]	1–4	685 [Friday]	0
Rotherham United	44.9	1–3	1,482	2–3	907	0
Peterborough United	50.7	1–1	1,725	0–4	1,007	1
Bradford City	81.4	1–2	1,064 [Friday]	1–2	740 [Boxing Day]	0
Macclesfield Town	83.0	3–1	121	2–1	202 [Tuesday]	6
Stockport County	86.7	0–1	819	3–1	191 [Tuesday]	3
Rochdale	101.6	2–1	468	2–0	263	6
Milton Keynes	109.0	1–2	528 [Friday]	0–4	403 [Sunday]	0
Bury	109.6	1–1	114 [NYs Day]	1–1	175 [Tuesday]	2
Accrington Stanley	120.1	2–0	105	3–0	209 [Tuesday]	6
Shrewsbury Town	120.2	0–4	375	2–1	268	3
Darlington	122.2	0–4	375	0–2	412	0
Chester City	125.2	0–1	151 [Friday]	2–1	205	3
Barnet	128.0	4–1	155	2–5	393	3
Wrexham	135.6	2–4	597	0–1	179	0
Brentford	142.0	3–1	376	0–1	465	3
Hereford United	142.8	2–1	381 [BH Monday]	1–3	209	3
Dagenham & Redbridge	147.3	2–0	191	0–1	468	3
Wycombe Wanderers	148.3	1–0	333	0–1	288	3
Morecambe	158.9	1–1	187	2–1	501	4

== Statistics ==
=== Club ===
==== Biggest win ====
Home
League Two: 4 – 1 vs Barnet Sat 15 Dec
FA Cup: Not Applicable
League Cup: Not Applicable
League Trophy: Not Applicable

Away
League Two: 3 – 0 vs Accrington Stanley Tues 12 Feb
FA Cup: Not Applicable
League Cup: Not Applicable
League Trophy: Not Applicable

==== Heaviest defeat ====
Home
League Two: 0 – 4 vs Shrewsbury Town Sat 11 Aug | 0 – 4 vs Darlington Sat 22 Dec
FA Cup:Not Applicable
League Cup:Not Applicable
League Trophy: 2 – 5 vs Hartlepool United Tues 9 Oct

Away
League Two: 0 – 4 vs Milton Keynes Dons Sun 14 Oct | 0 – 4 vs Peterborough United Sat 29 Mar
FA Cup: 1 – 3 vs Nottingham Forest Tues 27 Nov
League Cup: 1 – 4 vs Doncaster Rovers Tues 14 Aug
League Trophy:Not Applicable

==== Highest attendance ====
Home
League Two: 5,286 vs Bradford City Fri 7th Sept
FA Cup: 7,361 vs Nottingham Forest Sat 10 Nov
League Cup: Not Applicable
League Trophy: 936 vs Hartlepool United Tues 9 Oct

Away
League Two: 15,510 vs Bradford City Wed 26 Dec
FA Cup: 6,783 vs Nottingham Forest Tues 27 Nov
League Cup: 5,084 vs Doncaster Rovers
League Trophy: Not Applicable

==== Lowest attendance ====
Home
League Two: 3,189 vs Accrington Stanley Sat 25 Aug
FA Cup: 7,361 vs Nottingham Forest Sat 10 Nov
League Cup: Not Applicable
League Trophy: 936 vs Hartlepool United Tues 9 Oct

Away
League Two: 1,281 vs Accrington Stanley Tues 12 Feb
FA Cup: 6,783 vs Nottingham Forest Tues 27 Nov
League Cup: 5,084 vs Doncaster Rovers
League Trophy: Not Applicable

=== Individual ===
==== Goal scorers ====
Pos	Player	League	Cup	Total
ST	Ben Wright	15	0	15
ST	Jamie Forrester	12	2	14
ST	Louis Dodds	9	0	9
MF	Dany N'Guessan	7	0	7
ST	Mark Stallard	2	2	4
MF	Lee Frecklington	4	0	4
ST	Lenell John-Lewis	3	0	3
–	Own goal	1	1	2
MF	Scott Kerr	1	0	1
DF	Ryan Amoo	1	0	1
DF	Hamza Bencherif	1	0	1
DF	Daniel Hone	1	0	1
DF	Lee Beevers	1	0	1
ST	Gary King	1	0	1
DF	Paul Green	1	0	1

==== Discipline ====
Pos	Player	Booked	Sent off (straight red)	Points
MF	Scott Kerr	9	2	39
MF	Jamie Hand	6	0	18
DF	Gary Croft	2	2	18
DF	Paul Green	6	0	18
ST	Louis Dodds	5	0	15
ST	Mark Stallard	3	1	15
MF	Dany N'Guessan	3	1	15
DF	Danny Hone	4	0	12
DF	Hamza Bencherif	3	0	9
MF	Shane Clarke	1	1	9
MF	Lee Frecklington	2	0	6
DF	Nat Brown	2	0	6
ST	Oliver Ryan	0	1	6
DF	Lee Beevers	2	0	6
DF	Ryan Amoo	1	0	3
ST	Jamie Forrester	1	0	3
MF	Lenell John-Lewis	1	0	3
GK	Alan Marriott	1	0	3
MF	Martin Pembleton	1	0	3
DF	Adie Moses	1	0	3

3 Points for a yellow card
6 Points for a red card
