= Crowle Colts F.C. =

Crowle Colts FC
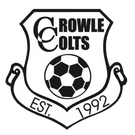
- Full name: Crowle Colts Football Club
- Nickname: The Colts
- Founded: 1992
- Ground: Windsor Park, Crowle
- Chairman: Robbie Pender
- Managers: Grant Black & Danny Frost
- League: Northern Counties East League Division One
- 2025–26: Northern Counties East League Division One, 10th of 22

Crowle Colts Football Club is an English football club based in Crowle, Lincolnshire. They are currently members of the Northern Counties East League Division One and play at Windsor Park.

== History ==
=== Crowle Teams prior to Crowle United ===
Pre-World War II, there were three main football teams in Crowle: Crowle Brickworks, Crowle Institute, and Crowle Town. After the war, the Sun Engineering side was formed and became Crowle's main team. It had a secondary team named Axholme Wanderers, which was formed for younger players who had only played football intermediately during the war. All of these sides competed in the Scunthorpe League.

=== Crowle United ===
In 1966, Crowle Sports, the reformed Sun Engineers side, unexpectedly resigned from the Scunthorpe League a week prior to the start of the season. As a result, all of the remaining Crowle Sports players joined Axholme Wanderers, which left just one main football team in Crowle. Ahead of the 1967–68 season, Axholme Wanderers reformed as Crowle United. United went on to have great local success, with their most notable achievement coming in the 1970–71 season when they completed a treble, being crowned champions of the Scunthorpe League, as well as winning the Scunthorpe Challenge Cup and the Lincolnshire FA County Junior Cup. In 1973, United joined the Lincolnshire League. They would go on to compete in the league for seventeen seasons, before leaving it at the end of the 1988–89 season due to ground issues, having left their Potts Lane ground to play at North Axholme School, which was deemed unsuitable.

=== Crowle Colts ===
In 1992, a junior football team named was formed under the name Crowle Colts, a name that had been used in previous years for junior sides in Crowle. In 1996, an emergency meeting took place which saw most of Crowle United's committee step down. United folded, and the following year, two new clubs were formed: Crowle United Junior Colts, who aligned with the Crowle Colts junior side, and Crowle FC, who took Crowle United's place in Division One of the Scunthorpe League. The two clubs ultimately decided to merge in 1999, resulting in the formation of the current team: Crowle Colts.

The Colts began life in Division Five of the Scunthorpe League in the 1997–98 season and would remain in the league until 2018, with the exception of three seasons in the Gainsborough and District League in the early 2000s.

At the start of the 2018–19 season, The Colts were crowned champions of the Scunthorpe League and joined the Central Midlands Football League. They went on to secure successive promotions. In the 2022–23 season, after three seasons in the Central Midlands League, the club joined the Lincolnshire League, following in the footsteps of the Crowle United side that had left the league 33 years earlier. That season saw The Colts match Crowle United's best ever finish in the Lincolnshire League, finishing third. The 2023–24 campaign saw that record surpassed, as The Colts finished runners-up to Nettleham despite scoring a record-breaking 149 league goals. They also won the Lincolnshire FA County Junior Cup that season for the first time in 53 years.

=== Joining the football pyramid ===
In the 2024–25 season, Crowle Colts were promoted to the Northern Counties East League Division One for the first time, after finishing second in the Lincolnshire League. They won the Lincolnshire FA County Junior Cup again that season, completing back-to-back triumphs in the competition.

In the 2025–26 season, their first in the Northern Counties East League, The Colts recorded an impressive 10th-place finish. They sat in the play-off positions at the halfway point of the season following an impressive start, but a difficult second half of the campaign, which included a run of seven successive defeats between December and February, saw them drop out of the play-off picture and finish mid-table. The club also took part in the FA Vase for the first time that season. They defeated Maine Road and Dearne & District in the first and second qualifying rounds respectively, before exiting at the hands of Rossington Main in the first round proper.

After a rocky start to the new season, winning just 1 of their first 5 matches, Crowle announced that their footballing management team including long standing manager Gav Cooper had all joined local rivals Club Thorne Colliery F.C. on the 24th August Colts announced a new management team of Grant Black and Danny Frost who had previously managed Brighouse Town F.C.

On 12 August 2026, it was confirmed that Colts' management team of Gav Cooper, Ben Simpson, Lee Ridley and Jon Taylor had left the club to join local and divisional rivals Club Thorne Colliery. On 22 August, the club announced a new management team of Grant Black and Danny Frost, who had recently managed together at Brighouse Town.

== Ground ==
Crowle Colts' home ground is Windsor Park, which is located on Godnow Road in Crowle. It was opened by then-Scunthorpe United manager Brian Laws in September 2005. The ground has a maximum capacity of around 500 and is equipped with floodlights, fencing, a pavilion, and other facilities. In October 2025, a 50-seater stand was added to the ground.

The majority of the various Crowle teams of the past played their football at the Sunfield Sports Ground (later renamed Crowle Sports Club), which was located on Potts Lane, Crowle. It closed in 1989 and United moved to North Axholme School, which required the club to resign from the Lincolnshire League, as it was deemed below the league's standards. Crowle Colts initially played at the school before moving to Windsor Park when it was opened in 2005.

== Club players and staff ==
=== Players ===
Players
Richard Adeaga
Harry Anderson Richardson
Kieran Atkin
Declan Bacon
Zach Beedle
George Burton
Thomas Dixon
Josh Eccles
Niall Edge
Ryan Farnham
Danny Frost
Alfie Fudge
Thomas Garner
Muhamet Gashi
Seb Glynn
Sam Goodhand
Bradley Grayson
Blake Gregory
Grant Hill
Kian Humphriss
Alexander Huntsman
Atley Jackson
Corey Lewis-Sleight
Brandon McClurey
Carlo Midwinter
Thomas Moulds
Rhys Plater
Kurt Robinson
Cryus Rowe
Joe Simpson
Matthew Steeper
Jamal Stewart
Alfred Thompson
Jordan Welch

=== Staff ===
Position	Name
Manager	Grant Black
Manager	Danny Frost
Physio	
Chairman	Robbie Pender
Match Secretary	Robbie Pender
Secretary	Oliver Saxon
Programme Editor	Gareth Parkin
Social Media	
Groundsman	Malcolm Staniforth

== Honours ==
Crowle United

- Lincolnshire FA Junior Cup
  - 1970–71
- Lincolnshire Football League Division One
  - 1972–73
- Scunthorpe & District Football League Division One
  - 1970–71, 1971–72
- Scunthorpe & District Football League Challenge Cup
  - 1970–71,
- Scunthorpe & District Football League LFA Benevolent Cup
  - 1988–89
- Scunthorpe & District Football League Hospital Cup
  - 1989–90
- Scunthorpe & District Football League Messingham Cup
  - 1974–75
- Scunthorpe & District Football League George Rowell Cup
  - 1985–86, 1986–87
- Scunthorpe & District Football League McDermid Cup
  - 1988–89
- Scunthorpe & District Football League Barton Brotherhood Cup
  - 1983–84
- Scunthorpe & District Football League Rod Mill Cup
  - 1988–89, 1989–90

Crowle Colts

- Lincolnshire FA Junior Cup
  - 2023–24, 2024–25
- Scunthorpe & District Football League Division One
  - 2017–18
- Scunthorpe & District Football League Division Two
  - 2015–16
- Scunthorpe & District Football League Challenge Cup
  - 2017–18,
- Scunthorpe & District Football League Nursing Cup
  - 2015–16
- Scunthorpe & District Football League Ironstone Cup
  - 2004–05
- Scunthorpe & District Football League Messingham Cup
  - 1997–98
- Scunthorpe & District Football League Barton Brotherhood Cup
  - 1997–98

== League positions ==
Crowle United

Year	League	Division	Finish	P	W	D	L	GF	GA	PTS
1967–68	Scunthorpe & District Football League	Three	2nd	26	19	3	4	105	37	41
1968–69	Scunthorpe & District Football League	Two	3rd	26	17	3	7	95	47	37
1969–70	Scunthorpe & District Football League	Two	5th	24	10	6	8	76	72	26
1970–71	Scunthorpe & District Football League	One	1st	26	18	4	4	77	37	40
1971–72	Scunthorpe & District Football League	One	1st	26	23	1	2	89	35	47
1972–73	Lincolnshire Football League	One	1st	28	19	3	6	82	36	41
1973–74	Lincolnshire Football League	Premier	13th	28	9	4	15	44	66	22
1974–75	Lincolnshire Football League	Premier	5th	26	11	7	8	43	33	29
1975–76	Lincolnshire Football League	Premier	4th	30	16	4	10	67	39	36
1976–77	Lincolnshire Football League	Premier	5th	28	14	3	11	69	60	31
1977–78	Lincolnshire Football League	Premier	3rd	26	14	3	9	56	37	31
1978–79	Lincolnshire Football League	Premier	9th	30	13	3	14	48	44	29
1979–80	Lincolnshire Football League	Premier	3rd	26	14	6	6	43	30	34
1980–81	Lincolnshire Football League	Premier	9th	30	13	4	13	49	44	30
1981–82	Lincolnshire Football League	Premier	8th	30	15	3	12	48	43	33
1982–83	Lincolnshire Football League	Premier	9th	30	11	8	11	42	53	30
1983–84	Lincolnshire Football League	Premier	8th	34	12	10	12	62	56	34
1984–85	Lincolnshire Football League	Premier	6th	32	14	8	10	54	42	36
1985–86	Lincolnshire Football League	Premier	10th	32	13	5	14	43	48	31
1986–87	Lincolnshire Football League	Premier	7th	26	10	7	9	40	52	27
1987–88	Lincolnshire Football League	Premier	5th	32	14	8	10	53	39	36
1988–89	Lincolnshire Football League	Premier	3rd	28	16	8	4	78	31	56
1989–90	Scunthorpe & District Football League	One	2nd	24	17	5	2	62	19	39
1990–91	Scunthorpe & District Football League	One	2nd	24	18	1	5	61	25	37
1991–92	Scunthorpe & District Football League	One	8th	20	6	1	13	23	40	13
1992–93	Scunthorpe & District Football League	One	9th	18	4	0	14	22	54	8
1993–94	Scunthorpe & District Football League	One	6th	20	7	6	7	48	34	20
1994–95	Scunthorpe & District Football League	One	9th	24	9	4	11	34	51	22
1995–96	Scunthorpe & District Football League	One	6th	24	11	3	10	61	39	25

Crowle Colts

Year	League	Division	Finish	P	W	D	L	GF	GA	PTS	Notes
1997–98	Scunthorpe & District Football League	Five	2nd	22	16	2	4	80	36	50	
1998–98	Scunthorpe & District Football League	Four	5th	20	9	5	6	69	40	32	
1999–2000	Scunthorpe & District Football League	Four	6th	18	6	5	7	38	51	23	
2000–01	Scunthorpe & District Football League	One	6th	20	9	5	6	72	46	32	Merged with Crowle FC
2001–02	Gainsborough & District League	One	10th	20	3	1	16	30	83	10	
2002–03	Gainsborough & District League	Two	6th	22	9	3	10	42	38	30	
2003–04	Gainsborough & District League	Two	7th	22	11	2	9	38	36	35	
2004–05	Scunthorpe & District Football League	Three	3rd	22	15	4	3	95	29	49	
2005–06	Scunthorpe & District Football League	Two	2nd	22	16	4	2	74	21	52	
2006–07	Scunthorpe & District Football League	One	4th	22	12	2	8	52	48	38	
2007–08	Scunthorpe & District Football League	Three	4th	22	16	3	5	64	32	48	
2008–09	Scunthorpe & District Football League	Two	3rd	26	13	8	5	63	37	50	
2009–10	Scunthorpe & District Football League	Two	4th	18	8	5	5	36	25	29	
2010–11	Scunthorpe & District Football League	One	8th	20	7	3	10	39	46	24	
2011–12	Scunthorpe & District Football League	One	9th	18	4	4	10	30	38	16	
2012–13	Scunthorpe & District Football League	One	9th	18	2	3	13	17	55	9	
2013–14	Scunthorpe & District Football League	Two	5th	18	7	4	7	35	38	25	
2014–15	Scunthorpe & District Football League	Two	9th	16	3	1	12	25	48	10	
2015–16	Scunthorpe & District Football League	Two	1st	14	14	0	0	79	10	42	
2016–17	Scunthorpe & District Football League	One	2nd	14	9	1	4	40	23	28	
2017–18	Scunthorpe & District Football League	One	1st	18	15	1	2	72	18	46	
2018–19	Central Midlands Alliance League	One North	2nd	20	17	1	2			42	
2019–20	Central Midlands Alliance League	Premier North	9th	17	6	2	9			20	League suspended due to COVID-19 pandemic
2020–21	Central Midlands Alliance League	Premier North	12th	5	2	0	3			6	League suspended due to COVID-19 pandemic
2021–22	Central Midlands Alliance League	Premier North	8th	32	13	5	14			44	
2022–23	Lincolnshire Football League	Premier	3rd	34	21	6	7			71	
2023–24	Lincolnshire Football League	Premier	2nd	32	23	5	4			74	
2024–25	Lincolnshire Football League	Premier	2nd	24	18	5	1			59	
2025–26	Northern Counties East Football League	One	10th	42	18	5	19	67	75	59	
2026-27	Northern Counties East Football League	One									
