= Adam Buckley =

English former professional footballer (born 1979)

Personal information
- Full name: Adam Christian Buckley
- Date of birth: 2 August 1979 (age 47)
- Place of birth: Nottingham, England
- Height: 5 ft 9 in (1.75 m)
- Position: Midfielder

Youth career
- 1995–1997: West Bromwich Albion

Senior career*
Years	Team	Apps	(Gls)
1996–1997	West Bromwich Albion	0	(0)
1997–2001	Grimsby Town	15	(0)
2001–2003	Lincoln City	34	(0)
2003	Brigg Town		
2003–2005	Harrowby United		
2005–2006	Stamford		
2006	Spalding United		
2006–2007	Bourne Town		
2007–2008	Spalding United		
2008	Lincoln Moorlands Railway		
2008–2009	Sleaford Town		
2009–2010	Lincoln Moorlands Railway		
2010–2011	Sleaford Town		
2011–2012	Nettleham		
2012	Lincoln Moorlands Railway		
2012	Gainsborough Town		
2012–2013	Lincoln Moorlands Railway		
- * Club domestic league appearances and goals as of 18:03, 18 June 2008 (UTC) ‡ National team caps and goals as of 23:33, 20 March 2008 (UTC)

Adam Christian Buckley (born 2 August 1979) is an English former professional footballer. He played as a midfielder from 1996 to 2013.

Buckley played as a professional in the Football League for Grimsby Town and Lincoln City between 1998 and 2003, after coming through the youth ranks at West Bromwich Albion. He then forged a career in non-league football and has played for Brigg Town, Harrowby United, Stamford, Spalding United, Bourne Town, Lincoln Moorlands Railway, Sleaford Town, Nettleham and Gainsborough Town.

== Career ==
=== Grimsby Town ===
Buckley first got his break in the professional game with West Bromwich Albion as an academy player in 1996, This was while his father, Alan Buckley was the club's manager. With limited chances though he failed to make the grade and step up to the first team at Albion, prompting Buckley to eventually follow his father to Grimsby Town in 1997, when Alan re-took the managerial post at Blundell Park for the second time.

He made his debut for Grimsby in a First Division defeat to Swindon Town on 24 April 1998. He would make one further appearance that season in another away defeat, this time to Watford. The following season, Buckley was eased into first-team action by his father, and was a regular presence on the bench during the 1999–00 campaign. During his time with The Mariners Buckley was cast aside by Grimsby supporters as a player who only featured professionally because his father was the club's manager.

There may have been truth in that factor as following the departure of his father from his managerial role in September 2000, Buckley junior failed to be included in any of new manager's Lennie Lawrence's teams. With this he would not even make the Grimsby substitute bench during the 2000–01, and to add to this he also struggled to hold down a place in the club's reserve team and in July 2001, his contract with Grimsby was cancelled by mutual consent.

=== Lincoln City ===
In July 2001, Buckley joined his father once again, agreeing a two-year contract with Lincoln City. He made his Football League debut, as a substitute, for Lincoln in the 3–0 home victory over Swansea City on 25 August and was a regular presence in the first-team squad during his first season, making a total of 31 league appearances, 12 of which came from the substitutes bench.

In April 2002, due to financial constraints, Alan Buckley departed Lincoln, and under new manager Keith Alexander chances were rare. Buckley would make only three league appearances, all from the substitutes bench, during the 2002–03 season with a further three appearances in cup competitions. The season did, however, bring Buckley his only goal in his professional career when he netted a free-kick in the 2–1 home defeat to Shrewsbury Town in the Football League Trophy on 12 November 2002. Buckley like at Grimsby also found cast aside by the Lincoln City supporters for only playing a part in first team affairs because his father was the team's manager.

His career at Lincoln ended when he was arrested over allegations of theft from the club's ground in May 2003. In June 2003 he was sentenced to 120 hours of community service after pleading guilty to four counts of theft from his teammates.

=== Non-League ===
Buckley then moved into Non-League football. He had an unsuccessful trial with Ilkeston Town, which was followed by a short spell with Brigg Town. He then joined Harrowby United in March 2004. In October 2005, he signed for Stamford, linking up with his former Harrowby boss Graham Drury. In February 2006, Buckley joined Spalding United on loan, debuting in the defeat to Kidsgrove Athletic on 19 February 2006; the move became permanent in April 2006.

He was released by Spalding in September 2006 and was next heard of at Bourne Town, making his debut in the 4–0 home defeat to St Neots Town on 7 March 2007. After an unsuccessful trial with Boston United in August 2007, Buckley linked up with Spalding United for a second time. Buckley then moved on to play with Lincoln Moorlands Railway in 2008. He made a brief sojourn to Sleaford Town, appearing for the club in a 1–1 friendly draw with Lincoln United on 12 November 2008, before returning to Moorlands. In September 2010, he joined Sleaford Town debuting in the 1–0 United Counties Football League Premier Division home victory over St Ives Town on 11 September 2010.

He moved on to play in the Lincoln Sunday League Premier Division for Welton Sports and joined Nettleham on the Saturdays. He then moved back to Lincoln Moorlands Railway for the remainder of the 2011–12 season before joining newly elected Lincolnshire League side Gainsborough Town in August 2012. Buckley failed to make a single appearance for Town and briefly re-joined Moorlands Railway where he eventually ceased playing competitive football in 2013.

== Personal life ==
He is the son of former Grimsby Town manager Alan Buckley, he played for his father while at West Bromwich Albion, Grimsby and Lincoln. He is also the nephew of the former Derby County and Lincoln City player, Steve Buckley. His elder brother Simon also had a short stint as a professional footballer and was contracted to Grimsby Town, West Bromwich Albion and Boston United but failed to make an appearance in the Football League.

His career at Lincoln ended when he was arrested over allegations of theft from the club's ground in May 2003. In June 2003 he was sentenced to 120 hours of community service after pleading guilty to four counts of theft from his teammates.

Buckley's son Brandon has played for Grimsby Town.
