= Robert Duffy (footballer) =

Welsh footballer and manager

Rob Duffy
Personal information
- Date of birth: 2 December 1982 (age 43)
- Place of birth: Swansea, Wales
- Position: Striker

Team information
- Current team: Basford United (Coach)

Youth career
- 1998–2001: Charlton Athletic

Senior career*
Years	Team	Apps	(Gls)
2001–2005	Rushden & Diamonds (Note: Soccerbase credits Duffy with 30 league appearances for Rushden & Diamonds, rather than 29. The discrepancy occurs in the 8 February 2003 game against Darlington, with Soccerbase stating Duffy came on as a substitute. However, the English National Football Archive, the Rushden & Diamonds Archive, and 11v11 all state he did not play any part in the game, with 11v11 specifically addressing the issue in the 'Comments' section)	29	(1)
2005	→ Stamford (loan)	2	(2)
2005	Cambridge United (Note: Soccerbase credits Duffy with 9 league appearances for Cambridge United, rather than 7. However, two of these appearances occur in April 2006, by which point he had already left the club. On closer inspection Cambridge United are not listed as playing a goalkeeper in either game, at which point it becomes clear that these two appearances actually belong to Ayden Duffy, not Robert Duffy)	7	(0)
2005	Kettering Town	4	(1)
2006	Gainsborough Trinity	?	(?)
2006	Stevenage Borough	1	(0)
2006–2008	Oxford United	56	(24)
2008	→ Wrexham (loan)	6	(0)
2008–2009	Newport County	21	(1)
2009–2011	Mansfield Town	78	(28)
2011–2012	Grimsby Town	52	(8)
2012–2013	Lincoln City	3	(0)
2013–2014	King's Lynn Town	27	(12)
2014–2015	Ilkeston	47	(21)
2015–2016	Nuneaton Town	31	(11)
2016–2018	Basford United	43	(13)
Total		407	(122)

Managerial career
- 2017–2018: Basford United (joint)
- * Club domestic league appearances and goals

Robert Duffy (born 2 December 1982) is a Welsh football coach and former professional footballer who is a first team coach at Basford United.

As a player he was a striker and is a Welsh former Youth and Under-21 international, and has also played for Rushden & Diamonds, Stamford, Cambridge United, Kettering Town, Gainsborough Trinity, Stevenage Borough, Oxford United, Wrexham, Newport County, Mansfield Town, Grimsby Town, Lincoln City, King's Lynn Town, Ilkeston, Nuneaton Town and Basford United.

== Playing career ==
=== Early career ===
Robert Duffy, who is older brother to footballer Richard Duffy, played his junior football in Swansea for Garden Village. He came through the youth system at Charlton Athletic, but was never offered a professional contract. Duffy followed Charlton's youth team manager Terry Westley to Rushden & Diamonds in 2001, where he made over 30 appearances, most as a substitute. He fractured his kneecap in a training ground accident in August 2003 and did not play again until January 2004, when he played most of a reserve game. He struggled to regain form, was loaned to non-league club Stamford and had short spells with Cambridge United and Kettering Town before joining Gainsborough Trinity in January 2006. Duffy ended the 2005–06 season at Stevenage Borough.

=== Oxford United ===
Duffy was recommended to Oxford United by former youth development officer, Malcolm Elias, and joined the club on a one-month trial in July 2006. He was signed by Oxford at the beginning of the 2006–07 season on a two-year contract, and was Oxford United's top scorer in that season, including a hat-trick against Forest Green Rovers in October 2006. In September 2007, Duffy broke his left arm after falling awkwardly during a match, which sidelined him for two months. In November, he returned to action as a late substitute in the 78th minute against Ebbsfleet United, but was sent off just 20 seconds later after an off-the-ball incident with Ebbsfleet's Mark Ricketts as he went past him.

Duffy was placed on the transfer list in January 2008 as manager Darren Patterson tried to free up funds to bring in new players, and joined Wrexham on loan later that month. He made only six substitute appearances for Wrexham and in April 2008, was released and returned to Oxford.

=== Newport County ===
He was released by Oxford at the end of the season and, after an unsuccessful trial at Mansfield Town, he signed for Conference South side Newport County in July 2008.

=== Mansfield Town ===
On 7 January 2009 Duffy then signed permanently for Mansfield Town, managed by David Holdsworth, twin brother of his manager at Newport County, Dean Holdsworth. Despite his lack of goals at Newport, David Holdsworth's faith in Duffy was repaid as he scored the winning goal on his Mansfield debut, going on to score eight further times as Mansfield pulled away from the Conference relegation zone to finish in mid-table.

=== Grimsby Town ===
On Monday 24 January 2011 it was stated on BBC Radio Humberside that Duffy had failed to agree personal terms with Grimsby Town after a fee was agreed between the two clubs. After further negotiation, it was announced on 28 January that Duffy had signed a two-year deal with the Mariners. Duffy scored 28 seconds into his Grimsby debut in their 3–2 win over Eastbourne Borough on 29 January 2011 and three days later he scored again as Town drew 2–2 away at Southport.

Following the conclusion of the 10–11 season and despite being under contract, Duffy was told that he no longer had a future at the club and he was free to find himself a new one. On 16 May 2011 Town chairman John Fenty mentioned that the club had made a mistake in signing Duffy and teammates Charles Ademeno and Serge Makofo. Duffy however stayed for nearly the entire 11–12 campaign, and after playing a cameo role all season he was released before the final game of the season.

=== Lincoln City ===
On Monday 21 May 2012 Duffy signed a 1-year contract with Lincoln City. On 9 April 2013 Duffy was released by the club after an injury hit season had restricted him to only 3 games during the 2012–13 season.

=== Non League ===
In August 2013 he joined King's Lynn Town. In March 2014, Duffy joined Ilkeston, debuting in the club's 2–0 home Northern Premier League defeat to Buxton on 15 March 2014. On 1 July 2015 he joined Nuneaton as a player coach.

On 1 July 2015, Duffy joined Nuneaton Town. In June 2016 he moved on to join Basford United.

== Coaching career ==
Having previously co-managed with Martin Carruthers, Duffy re-joined Basford as a coach under Steve Chettle on 12 March 2020.

== Personal life ==
He is also a qualified physiotherapist having graduated from the University of Salford in 2016.

== Career statistics ==
Club	Season	League			FA Cup		League Cup		Other		Total	
Club	Season	Division	Apps	Goals	Apps	Goals	Apps	Goals	Apps	Goals	Apps	Goals
Rushden & Diamonds	2000–01	Football Conference	0	0	0	0	—		4 (Note: Two appearances one goal in Northamptonshire Senior Cup; one appearance in FA Trophy; one appearance in Conference League Cup)	1	4	1
Rushden & Diamonds	2001–02	Division Three	8	1	1	0	1	0	1 (Note: Appearance(s) in Northamptonshire Cup)	0	11	1
Rushden & Diamonds	2002–03	Division Three	12	0	3	3	0	0	1 (Note: Appearance(s) in Football League Trophy)	0	16	3
Rushden & Diamonds	2003–04	Division Two	8	0	0	0	0	0	0	0	8	0
Rushden & Diamonds	2004–05	League Two	1	0	0	0	0	0	0	0	1	0
Rushden & Diamonds	Total		29	1	4	3	1	0	6	1	40	5
Cambridge United	2005–06	Conference National	7	0	0	0	—		0	0	7	0
Stevenage Borough	2005–06	Conference National	1	0	—		—		—		1	0
Oxford United	2006–07	Conference National	36	18	0	0	—		3 (Note: Two appearances in Conference National play-offs; one appearance one goal in FA Trophy)	1	39	19
Oxford United	2007–08	Conference Premier	20	6	1	0	—		0	0	21	6
Oxford United	Total		56	24	1	0	—		3	1	60	25
Wrexham (loan)	2007–08	League Two	6	0	—		—		—		6	0
Newport County	2008–09	Conference South	21	1	2	1	—		4 (Note: Two appearances in FA Trophy; two appearances one goal in Conference League Cup)	1	27	3
Mansfield Town	2008–09	Conference Premier	21	9	0	0	—		0	0	21	9
Mansfield Town	2009–10	Conference Premier	38	14	3	2	—		1 (Note: Appearance(s) in FA Trophy)	0	42	16
Mansfield Town	2010–11	Conference Premier	19	5	2	0	—		1	1	22	6
Mansfield Town	Total		78	28	5	2	—		2	1	85	31
Grimsby Town	2010–11	Conference Premier	17	2	—		—		—		17	2
Grimsby Town	2011–12	Conference Premier	35	6	4	3	—		4	1	43	10
Grimsby Town	Total		52	8	4	3	—		4	1	60	12
Lincoln City	2012–13	Conference Premier	3	0	0	0	—		0	0	3	0
King's Lynn Town	2013–14	Northern Premier League Premier Division	27	12	1	1	—		0	0	28	13
Ilkeston	2013–14	Northern Premier League Premier Division	6	2	—		—		0	0	6	2
Ilkeston	2014–15	Northern Premier League Premier Division	41	19	3	1	—		4 (Note: Two appearances in Northern Premier League Premier Division play-offs, one appearance in FA Trophy, one appearance in Northern Premier League Challenge Cup)	0	48	20
Ilkeston	Total		47	21	3	1	—		4	0	54	22
Nuneaton Town	2015–16	National League North	31	11	2	0	—		4 (Note: Two appearances one goal in FA Trophy; two appearances in Birmingham Senior Cup)	1	37	12
Career total			358	106	22	11	1	0	27	6	408	123

== Honours ==
Rushden & Diamonds

- Football League Third Division: 2002–03

Grimsby Town

- Lincolnshire Senior Cup: 2011–12
