= 2015–16 Derby County F.C. season =

Derby County
2015–16 season
- Chairman: Mel Morris
- Head Coach: Paul Clement (until 8 February); Darren Wassall (from 8 February)
- Stadium: iPro Stadium
- Championship: 5th
- FA Cup: Fourth round (knocked out by Manchester United)
- League Cup: First round (knocked out by Portsmouth)
- Top goalscorer: League: Chris Martin (13); All: Chris Martin (13)
- Highest home attendance: 33,010
- Lowest home attendance: 26,834
- Average home league attendance: 29,378
Home colours	Away colours	Third colours

The 2015–16 season was Derby County's eighth consecutive season in the Championship in their 132nd year in existence. Along with competing in the Championship, the club also participated in the FA Cup and League Cup. The season covers the period from 1 July 2015 to 30 June 2016.

== Transfers ==
=== Transfers in ===
Date from	Position	Nationality	Name	From	Fee	Ref.
1 July 2015	DM	NIR	Chris Baird	West Bromwich Albion	Free transfer	
1 July 2015	CF	ENG	Darren Bent	Aston Villa	Free transfer	
1 July 2015	GK	ENG	Scott Carson	Wigan Athletic	Undisclosed	
1 July 2015	CB	IRL	Alex Pearce	Reading	Free transfer	
1 July 2015	ST	AUT	Andreas Weimann	Aston Villa	£2,750,000	
3 July 2015	LW	ENG	Tom Ince	Hull City	£4,750,000	
23 July 2015	CB	ENG	Jason Shackell	Burnley	£3,000,000	
1 September 2015	CM	ENG	Jacob Butterfield	Huddersfield Town	£4,000,000	
1 September 2015	CM	ENG	Bradley Johnson	Norwich City	£6,000,000	
4 January 2016	LW	GUI	Abdoul Camara	Angers	£1,250,000	
6 January 2016	ST	ENG	Nick Blackman	Reading	£2,500,000	
20 January 2016	CF	ENG	Luke Thomas	Cheltenham Town	Undisclosed	
20 January 2016	AM	ENG	Lewis Walker	Ilkeston	Undisclosed	
20 January 2016	RB	ENG	Jayden Bogle	Swindon Town	Free transfer	
20 January 2016	CF	ENG	Jayden Mitchell-Lawson	Swindon Town	Free transfer	
26 January 2016	LB	SWE	Marcus Olsson	Blackburn Rovers	Undisclosed	

Total spending: ▼£24,250,000

=== Transfers out ===
Date from	Position	Nationality	Name	To	Fee	Ref.
1 July 2015	CB	ENG	Shaun Barker	Free Agent	Released	
1 July 2015	RB	SCO	Sam Dryden	Dundee	Free transfer	
1 July 2015	GK	ENG	Ross Etheridge	Accrington Stanley (Note: Following Etheridge's release he joined Accrington Stanley.)	Free transfer	
1 July 2015	DM	ENG	John Eustace	Free Agent	Released	
1 July 2015	CM	ENG	Luke Hendrie	Burnley (Note: Following Hendrie's release he joined Burnley.)	Released	
1 July 2015	CB	ENG	Josh Lelan	Northampton Town (Note: Following Lelan's release he joined Northampton Town.)	Free transfer	
1 July 2015	LB	ENG	Lee Naylor	Free Agent	Released	
1 July 2015	CB	ENG	Tom Naylor	Burton Albion (Note: Following Naylor's release he joined Burton Albion.)	Free transfer	
1 July 2015	CB	IRL	Mark O'Brien	Luton Town (Note: Following O'Brien's release he joined Luton Town.)	Free transfer	
1 July 2015	LB	NIR	Rhys Sharpe	Notts County (Note: Following Sharpe's release he joined Notts County.)	Free transfer	
1 July 2015	LW	NIR	Jamie Ward	Nottingham Forest (Note: Following Ward's release he joined Nottingham Forest.)	Free transfer	
1 July 2015	CB	USA	Zak Whitbread	Free Agent	Released	
6 January 2016	MF	JAM	Simon Dawkins	San Jose Earthquakes	Undisclosed	
3 March 2016	DF	SWE	Isak Ssewankambo	Molde FK	Undisclosed	

=== Loans out ===
Date from	Position	Nationality	Name	To	Date until	Ref.
15 July 2015	CB	ENG	Farrend Rawson	Rotherham United	End of Season	
15 July 2015	GK	NED	Kelle Roos	Rotherham United	1 September 2015 (Note: On 1 September 2015, Roos mutually terminated his loan spell with Rotherham United.)	
21 July 2015	CB	ESP	Raúl Albentosa	Málaga	End of season	
25 July 2015	CF	IRL	Conor Sammon	Sheffield United	End of season	
29 July 2015	CF	ENG	Kwame Thomas	Blackpool	2 January 2016	
15 January 2016	CF	ENG	Mason Bennett	Burton Albion	End of season	
28 January 2016	CB	ENG	Ryan Shotton	Birmingham City	End of season	
1 February 2016	GK	NED	Kelle Roos	A.F.C. Wimbledon	End of season	
18 February 2016	DF	NIR	Chris Baird	Fulham	End of season	
7 March 2016	LB	ENG	Stephen Warnock	Wigan Athletic	End of season	

== Competitions ==
=== Pre-season friendlies ===
On 19 May 2015, Derby County announced Benfica would visit as part of their pre-season schedule. Also the club confirmed they would head to Netherlands for a week. Derby County will also play a number of friendlies in England. On 24 May, Derby County confirmed the pre-season match against Benfica originally scheduled has been cancelled due to the Portuguese club being involved in the 2015 International Champions Cup. On 16 June 2015, Derby County announced pre-season friendlies against Nuneaton Town and Alfreton Town have been cancelled and replaced by a trip to Grimsby Town. On 26 June 2015, as part of pre-season preparations Derby County will host Spanish side Villarreal.

10 July 2015 Friendly	Belper Town	2–2	Derby County XI	Belper
19:30 BST	Lister 13'; Watt 48'	Report	Caspar 50', 83'	Stadium: Christchurch Meadow; Attendance: 700

11 July 2015 Friendly	Grimsby Town	2–1	Derby County	Cleethorpes
15:00 BST	Amond 25'; Clay 28'	Report	Russell 48'	Stadium: Blundell Park; Attendance: 2,729

18 July 2015 Friendly	Northampton Town	0–1	Derby County	Northampton
14:00 BST		Report	Russell 33'	Stadium: Sixfields Stadium; Attendance: 2,542 (1,226 Away fans)

21 July 2015 Friendly	SV Meppen	0–1	Derby County	Nieuwleusen, Netherlands
19:30 BST		Report	Ince 44'

24 July 2015 Friendly	Utrecht	2–3	Derby County	Utrecht, Netherlands
14:00 CEST	Barazite 14', 80'	Report	Shotton 45'; Russell 55'; Hughes 68'	Stadium: Sportpark Zoudenbalch

29 July 2015 Friendly	Derby County	1–1	Villarreal	Derby
19:45 BST	Weimann 64'	Report	Baptistão 27'	Stadium: Pride Park Stadium; Attendance: 17,304

1 August 2015 Friendly	Burton Albion	1–3	Derby County	Burton-upon-Trent
15:00 BST	Thiele 59'	Report	Bent 11'; Weimann 29'; Russell 71'	Stadium: Pirelli Stadium; Attendance: 5,302

=== Championship ===
==== League table ====
Pos	Team	Pld	W	D	L	GF	GA	GD	Pts	Promotion, qualification or relegation
3	Brighton & Hove Albion	46	24	17	5	72	42	+30	89	Qualification for the Championship play-offs (Note: Four teams play for one spot and promotion to the Premier League.)
4	Hull City (O, P)	46	24	11	11	69	35	+34	83	Qualification for the Championship play-offs
5	Derby County	46	21	15	10	66	43	+23	78	Qualification for the Championship play-offs
6	Sheffield Wednesday	46	19	17	10	66	45	+21	74	Qualification for the Championship play-offs
7	Ipswich Town	46	18	15	13	53	51	+2	69	

Source: BBC Sport
Rules for classification: 1) Points; 2) Goal difference; 3) Number of goals scored
(O) Play-off winners; (P) Promoted

==== Results by matchday ====
Matchday	1	2	3	4	5	6	7	8	9	10	11	12	13	14	15	16	17	18	19	20	21	22	23	24	25	26	27	28	29	30	31	32	33	34	35	36	37	38	39	40	41	42	43	44	45	46
Ground	A	H	H	A	H	A	A	H	A	H	H	A	A	H	H	A	H	A	A	H	H	A	H	A	A	H	H	A	H	A	H	A	H	A	H	A	A	H	A	H	H	A	A	H	A	H
Result	D	D	D	D	L	W	W	D	W	W	W	D	W	W	W	L	W	W	D	D	W	W	W	D	L	D	L	L	D	D	L	W	W	L	W	L	D	W	L	W	W	W	W	D	D	L
Position	14	15	14	12	19	13	10	11	9	7	6	7	5	5	5	5	4	3	3	4	3	2	1	2	2	2	3	5	5	5	6	5	5	5	5	5	5	5	6	6	5	5	5	5	5	5

Updated to match(es) played on 7 May 2016. Source: Statto.com
A = Away; H = Home; W = Win; D = Draw; L = Loss

==== Matches ====
On 17 June 2015, the fixtures for the forthcoming season were announced.

8 August 2015 1	Bolton Wanderers	0–0	Derby County	Horwich
15:00 BST	Spearing (red card) 86'; Wilson (yellow card) 16'	Report	Thorne (yellow card) 90'	Stadium: Macron Stadium; Attendance: 17,162; Referee: Andy Madley

15 August 2015 2	Derby County	1–1	Charlton Athletic	Derby
15:00 BST	Martin 68'	Report	Watt 48'	Stadium: Pride Park Stadium; Attendance: 29,045; Referee: Nigel Miller

18 August 2015 3	Derby County	1–1	Middlesbrough	Derby
19:45 BST	Russell 88'	Report	Kike 16'	Stadium: Pride Park Stadium; Attendance: 30,855; Referee: Steve Martin

21 August 2015 4	Birmingham City	1–1	Derby County	Birmingham
19:45 BST	Gleeson 45'	Report	Russell 61'	Stadium: St Andrew's; Attendance: 18,134; Referee: Lee Mason

29 August 2015 5	Derby County	1–2	Leeds United	Derby
12:05 BST	Martin 48'	Report	Adeyemi 43'; Wood 88'	Stadium: Pride Park Stadium; Attendance: 29,386 (2,335 away); Referee: Darren Bond

12 September 2015 6	Preston North End	1–2	Derby County	Preston
15:00 BST	Johnson 90'	Report	Martin 23', 36'	Stadium: Deepdale; Attendance: 14,552; Referee: Richard Clark

15 September 2015 7	Reading	0–1	Derby County	Reading
20:00 BST	Sá (red card) 45'	Report	Ince 69'	Stadium: Madejski Stadium; Attendance: 15,697; Referee: Andy Davies

21 September 2015 8	Derby County	0–0	Burnley	Derby
19:45 BST		Report		Stadium: Pride Park Stadium; Attendance: 26,834; Referee: Dean Whitestone

26 September 2015 9	Milton Keynes Dons	1–3	Derby County	Denbigh
12:30 BST	Murphy 60'	Report	Johnson 53'; Bent 89'; Ince 90'	Stadium: Stadium:mk; Attendance: 13,554; Referee: Chris Kavanagh

3 October 2015 10	Derby County	2–0	Brentford	Derby
15:00 BST	Martin 20'; Ince 44'	Report		Stadium: Pride Park Stadium; Attendance: 29,467; Referee: Jeremy Simpson

18 October 2015 11	Derby County	4–2	Wolverhampton Wanderers	Derby
13:15 BST	Martin 3', 28'; Johnson 45'; Russell 57'	Report	Afobe 19'; Le Fondre 64'	Stadium: Pride Park Stadium; Attendance: 29,063 (1,391 away); Referee: Andy Madley

21 October 2015 12	Blackburn Rovers	0–0	Derby County	Blackburn
19:45 BST		Report		Stadium: Ewood Park; Attendance: 12,968; Referee: Darren Drysdale

24 October 2015 13	Huddersfield Town	1–2	Derby County	Huddersfield
15:00 BST	Bunn 31'	Report	Martin 15'; Thorne 48'	Stadium: John Smith's Stadium; Attendance: 15,371; Referee: Tony Harrington

31 October 2015 14	Derby County	3–0	Rotherham United	Derby
15:00 GMT	Weimann 7'; Butterfield 45'; Keogh 76'	Report		Stadium: Pride Park Stadium; Attendance: 30,172; Referee: Scott Duncan

3 November 2015 15	Derby County	1–0	Queens Park Rangers	Derby
19:45 GMT	Weimann 51'	Report		Stadium: Pride Park Stadium; Attendance: 28,502; Referee: Keith Stroud

6 November 2015 16	Nottingham Forest	1–0	Derby County	Nottingham
19:30 GMT	Oliveira 4'	Report		Stadium: City Ground; Attendance: 25,114; Referee: Simon Hooper

21 November 2015 17	Derby County	2–0	Cardiff City	Derby
15:00 GMT	Thorne 55'; Weimann 76'	Report		Stadium: Pride Park Stadium; Attendance: 29,526; Referee: Eddie Ilderton

27 November 2015 18	Hull City	0–2	Derby County	Kingston upon Hull
19:45 GMT		Report	Butterfield 18', 36'	Stadium: KC Stadium; Attendance: 17,410; Referee: Geoff Eltringham

6 December 2015 19	Sheffield Wednesday	0–0	Derby County	Sheffield
13:15 GMT		Report		Stadium: Hillsborough Stadium; Attendance: 19,252; Referee: Graham Scott

12 December 2015 20	Derby County	2–2	Brighton & Hove Albion	Derby
15:00 GMT	Johnson 41'; Martin 88' (pen.)	Report	Wilson 22' van La Parra 75'	Stadium: iPro Stadium; Attendance: 30,537; Referee: Lee Mason

15 December 2015 21	Derby County	4–0	Bristol City	Derby
19:45 GMT	Ince 42', 63', 71'; Russell 76'	Report		Stadium: iPro Stadium; Attendance: 27,781; Referee: Andy Woolmer

19 December 2015 22	Ipswich Town	0–1	Derby County	Ipswich
15:00 GMT		Report	Ince 40'	Stadium: Portman Road; Attendance: 20,161; Referee: Keith Hill

26 December 2015 23	Derby County	2–0	Fulham	Derby
15:00 GMT	Ream 52' (o.g.); Butterfield 84'	Report		Stadium: iPro Stadium; Attendance: 32,134; Referee: Scott Duncan

29 December 2015 24	Leeds United	2–2	Derby County	Leeds
19:45 GMT	Bamba 42'; Wood 71'	Report	Hendrick 13'; Ince 78'	Stadium: Elland Road; Attendance: 23,027; Referee: Mark Heywood

2 January 2016 25	Middlesbrough	2–0	Derby County	Middlesbrough
15:00 GMT	Adomah 83'; Friend 84'	Report		Stadium: Riverside Stadium; Attendance: 32,870; Referee: Neil Swarbrick

12 January 2016 26	Derby County	1–1	Reading	Derby
19:45 GMT	Shackell 11'	Report	Williams 38'	Stadium: iPro Stadium; Attendance: 28,175; Referee: David Coote

16 January 2016 27	Derby County	0–3	Birmingham City	Derby
15:00 GMT		Report	Robinson 59'; Gleeson 74'; Kieftenbeld 80'	Stadium: iPro Stadium; Attendance: 32,895 (3,097 away); Referee: Tim Robinson

25 January 2016 28	Burnley	4–1	Derby County	Burnley
19:45 GMT	Keogh 29' (og); Gray 54' (pen.); Vokes 58' (pen.); Arfield 66'	Report	Butterfield 30'	Stadium: Turf Moor; Attendance: 15,214; Referee: Michael Oliver

2 February 2016 29	Derby County	0–0	Preston North End	Derby
19:45 GMT		Report		Stadium: iPro Stadium; Attendance: 27,252; Referee: Oliver Langford

6 February 2016 30	Fulham	1–1	Derby County	Fulham
15:00 GMT	Olsson 17' (og)	Report	Bryson 44'	Stadium: Craven Cottage; Attendance: 18,472; Referee: Darren Deadman

13 February 2016 31	Derby County	0–1	Milton Keynes Dons	Derby
15:00 GMT		Report	Forster-Caskey 82'	Stadium: iPro Stadium; Attendance: 30,075; Referee: Geoff Eltringham

20 February 2016 32	Brentford	1–3	Derby County	Brentford
15:00 GMT	Judge 52'	Report	Hendrick 80'; Christie 84'; Martin 90'	Stadium: Griffin Park; Attendance: 10,627; Referee: Darren Drysdale

24 February 2016 33	Derby County	1–0	Blackburn Rovers	Derby
19:45 GMT	Butterfield 8'	Report		Stadium: iPro Stadium; Attendance: 27,411; Referee: Nigel Miller

27 February 2016 34	Wolverhampton Wanderers	2–1	Derby County	Wolverhampton
12:30 GMT	Saville 14', 86'	Report	Martin 44'	Stadium: Molineux; Attendance: 19,398 (1,714 away); Referee: Graham Scott

5 March 2016 35	Derby County	2–0	Huddersfield Town	Derby
15:00 GMT	Martin 31'; Russell 73'	Report		Stadium: iPro Stadium; Attendance: 29,698; Referee: Eddie Ilderton

8 March 2016 36	Queens Park Rangers	2–0	Derby County	Shepherd's Bush
19:45 GMT	Chery 24'; Angella 86'	Report		Stadium: Loftus Road; Attendance: 14,049; Referee: Neil Swarbrick

12 March 2016 37	Rotherham United	3–3	Derby County	Rotherham
15:00 GMT	Mattock (yellow card) 6'; Ward 83'; Best 85', 90'	Report	Ince 55', 65'; Martin 63'	Stadium: New York Stadium; Attendance: 11,163; Referee: David Webb

19 March 2016 38	Derby County	1–0	Nottingham Forest	Derby
12:30 GMT	Hanson (yellow card) 53'; Olsson 79'; Keogh (yellow card) 84'	Report	Mendes (yellow card) 55'; Mills (yellow card) 84'	Stadium: Pride Park Stadium; Attendance: 33,010; Referee: Keith Stroud

2 April 2016 39	Cardiff City	2–1	Derby County	Cardiff
15:00 BST	Ecuele 37'; Pilkington (yellow card) 45'; O'Keefe 68'; Whittingham (yellow card) 80'	Report	Shackell (yellow card) 45'; Martin 49'	Stadium: Cardiff City Stadium; Attendance: 28,680; Referee: Chris Kavanagh

5 April 2016 40	Derby County	4–0	Hull City	Derby
19:45 BST	Johnson 29', 38'; Martin 84'; Bryson 90'	Report	Odubajo (red card) 55'	Stadium: iPro Stadium; Attendance: 29,078; Referee: Tony Harrington

9 April 2016 41	Derby County	4–1	Bolton Wanderers	Derby
19:45 BST	Russell 13', 77'; Ince 38'; Butterfield 69'		Clough 73' (pen.)	Stadium: iPro Stadium; Attendance: 29,674; Referee: Andy Woolmer

16 April 2016 42	Charlton Athletic	0–1	Derby County	Charlton
15:00 BST			Russell 60'	Stadium: The Valley; Attendance: 15,857; Referee: Darren Bond

19 April 2016 43	Bristol City	2–3	Derby County	Bristol
19:45 GMT	Kodjia 38'; Reid 44'	Report	Russell 37'; Bryson 52'; Ince 57'	Stadium: Ashton Gate; Attendance: 15,341; Referee: Andy Davies

23 April 2016 44	Derby County	1–1	Sheffield Wednesday	Derby
12:30 BST	Hughes (yellow card) 19'; Bryson (yellow card) 48'; Martin (yellow card) 73'; Keogh (yellow card) 77'; Butterfield (yellow card) 80'; Bent 82'	Report	Lee (yellow card) 54'; Bannan 69'; Forestieri (yellow card) 79'; Hélan (yellow card) 88'; Pudil (yellow card) 90+5'	Stadium: Pride Park Stadium; Attendance: 31,825; Referee: Lee Mason

2 May 2016 45	Brighton & Hove Albion	1–1	Derby County	Brighton
14:30 BST	Dunk (yellow card) 42' (yellow-red card) 83'; Wilson 90+5'	Report	Thorne (yellow card) 38'; Ince (yellow card) 63'; Weimann 71'; Christie (yellow card) 72'	Stadium: Falmer Stadium; Attendance: 30,292; Referee: Robert Madley

7 May 2016 46	Derby County	0–1	Ipswich Town	Derby
12:30 BST	Keogh (yellow card) 44'; Martin (yellow card) 65'	Report	Chambers (yellow card) 31'; McGoldrick 34' (pen.); McDonnell (yellow card) 39'	Stadium: iPro Stadium; Attendance: 29,854; Referee: Tim Robinson

=== FA Cup ===
On 16 December 2015, it was confirmed that Derby County would be drawn away against League Two side Hartlepool United after they won their second round replay against Salford City.

9 January 2016 Third round	Hartlepool United	1–2	Derby County	Hartlepool
15:00	Gray 61'	Report	Butterfield 67'; Bent 85'	Stadium: Victoria Park; Attendance: 4,860; Referee: Darren Bond

29 January 2016 Fourth round	Derby County	1–3	Manchester United	Derby
19:55	Thorne 37'; Warnock (yellow card) 54'	Report	Rooney 16'; Blind 65'; Mata 83'	Stadium: iPro Stadium; Attendance: 31,134; Referee: Anthony Taylor

=== League Cup ===
On 16 June 2015, the first round draw was made, Derby County were drawn away against Portsmouth.

12 August 2015 First round	Portsmouth	2–1	Derby County	Milton
19:45 BST	McGurk 49'; Chaplin 76'	Report	Shackell 73'	Stadium: Fratton Park; Attendance: 11,573; Referee: Paul Tierney

==== Football League play-offs ====
As a result of Derby County finishing in fifth place in the Championship they qualified for the Football League play-offs. In the play-off semi finals Derby County will play against fourth placed team Hull City over two legs.

14 May 2016 Semi final (1st leg)	Derby County	0–3	Hull City	Derby
12:30 BST	Olsson (yellow card) 28'	Report	Hernández 30'; Dawson (yellow card) 35'; Shackell 40' (o.g.); Livermore (yellow card) 45+2'; Odubajo (yellow card) 72'; Robertson 90+8'	Stadium: Pride Park Stadium; Attendance: 29,969; Referee: Neil Swarbrick

17 May 2016 Semi final (2nd leg)	Hull City	0–2	Derby County	Kingston upon Hull
19:45 BST	Snodgrass (yellow card) 22'; Livermore (yellow card) 30'; Odubajo (yellow card) 50'	Report	Russell 7' (pen.); Robertson 36' (o.g.)	Stadium: KC Stadium; Attendance: 20,470; Referee: Michael Oliver

== Top scorers ==
Last updated: 18 May 2016

_{Note: Flags indicate national team as has been defined under FIFA eligibility rules. Players may hold more than one non-FIFA nationality.}

No.	Nationality	Name	Championship	FA Cup	League Cup	Play-offs	Total
9	(Scotland)	Chris Martin	15	0	0	0	15
23	(England)	Tom Ince	12	0	0	0	12
11	(Scotland)	Johnny Russell	9	0	0	1	10
18	(England)	Jacob Butterfield	7	1	0	0	8
15	(England)	Bradley Johnson	5	0	0	0	5
24	(Austria)	Andreas Weimann	4	0	0	0	4
4	(Scotland)	Craig Bryson	3	0	0	0	3
34	(England)	George Thorne	2	1	0	0	3
10	(England)	Darren Bent	2	1	0	0	3
8	(Republic of Ireland)	Jeff Hendrick	2	0	0	0	2
14	(England)	Jason Shackell	1	0	1	0	2
6	(Republic of Ireland)	Richard Keogh	1	0	0	0	1
2	(Republic of Ireland)	Cyrus Christie	1	0	0	0	1
29	(Sweden)	Marcus Olsson	1	0	0	0	1
Own goals			1	0	0	1	2
TOTAL			66	3	1	2	72
