= Lincolnshire Football Association =

Governing body of football in England

The Lincolnshire Football Association, often known simply as the Lincolnshire FA, is the governing body of football in the county of Lincolnshire, England. The Lincolnshire FA runs a number of cups at different levels for teams all across Lincolnshire.

== Affiliated Leagues ==
=== Men's Saturday Leagues ===
- Lincolnshire Football League
- Boston and District League
- East Lincolnshire Combination
- Grantham and District Saturday League
- Lincoln League
- Scunthorpe and District League

=== Men's Sunday Leagues ===
- Boston and District Sunday League
- Grantham and District Sunday League
- Grimsby Cleethorpes and District Sunday League
- Grimsby Intermediate League (Sunday)
- Lincoln and District Sunday League
- Scunthorpe and District Sunday League
- Spalding and District Sunday League

=== Ladies and Girls Leagues ===
- Lincolnshire Women's County League
- Lincolnshire County Girls League
- South Humber Ladies League

=== Other Leagues ===
- Lincolnshire Ability Counts League

=== Youth Leagues ===
- Lincolnshire Intermediate League (U18)
- Caparo Junior League
- Caparo Mini Soccer League
- Gainsborough and District Mini Soccer League
- Grantham Youth League
- Mid Lincs Mini Soccer League
- Mid Lincs Youth League (Boys)

=== Small Sided Leagues ===
- Champion Soccer Lincoln Soccer Six
- Grimsby Football Mundial Monday League
- Grimsby Football Mundial Thursday League
- North Kesteven Soccer Sixes
- Scunthorpe Mundial Six A Side League
- Scunthorpe Sunday Soccer Sixes League
- Yarborough Soccer Sixes
