= Ollie Ryan =

English footballer (born 1985)

Personal information
- Full name: Oliver Paul Ryan
- Date of birth: 26 September 1985 (age 41)
- Place of birth: Boston, Lincolnshire, England
- Position: Forward

Youth career
- 2002–2005: Lincoln City

Senior career*
Years	Team	Apps	(Gls)
2004–2008	Lincoln City	36	(0)
2004–2005	→ Spalding United (work experience)		
2005–2006	→ Ilkeston Town (loan)	5	(0)
2007–2008	Hucknall Town	4	(1)
2007–2008	→ Bourne Town (dual registration)	1	(1)
2008–2009	Boston United		
2009–2010	Harrogate Town		
2010	→ Belper Town (loan)		
2010–2011	Northwich Victoria		
2011–2012	Frickley Athletic		
2012	Scarborough Athletic		
2013–2014	Staveley Miners Welfare		
- * Club domestic league appearances and goals as of 20:32, 30 May 2008 (UTC)

Oliver Paul Ryan (born 26 September 1985) is an English former footballer. He played professionally with Lincoln City as a forward, as well as for a number of non-league teams.

== Early career ==
Ryan attended Kirton Primary School before moving on to Boston Grammar School. He played junior football with Nortoft Boys and Boston Town in the Mid Lincolnshire Youth League before joining Lincoln City's Centre of Excellence on 26 October 2000 despite an offer from Leicester City. Having earned representative honours with the Lincolnshire Schools Under-16s and the Lincolnshire FA Under-16s, Ryan was awarded a three-year scholarship with the Imps commencing at the start of the 2002–03 season.

Ryan made impressive strides during his scholarship and at the end of his second year he was named Lincoln's Young Player of the Season. His third year saw him spend an impressive work experience spell with Spalding United, scoring in each of his first two appearances. On his return to Lincoln, he entered the first team squad, making his debut, as a substitute, in the 3–0 FA Cup defeat at Hartlepool United on 13 November 2004 with his Football league debut coming a week later in the 3–0 away victory over Darlington. He returned to Spalding for a second spell of work experience, once again marking his first appearance with a goal in the 3–1 away victory over Gresley Rovers on 6 January 2005. By the end of his scholarship, Ryan had made six league appearances for Lincoln, all from the substitutes bench, and along with fellow scholars Lee Frecklington and Chris Gordon, agreed a one-year professional contract.

== Professional career ==
His first season as a professional saw him make intermittent appearances without finding the net and in November 2005 he linked up with Ilkeston Town on a month's loan debuting in the 3–1 home victory over Gateshead on 5 November 2005. Recalled to Lincoln in December, he agreed a one-year extension to his Lincoln contract in March 2006.

His second professional season saw Ryan restricted to only seven league appearances, all from the substitutes bench, and despite regular goals for the reserve team he could not find a goal for the first-team. He was, however, given a final opportunity to impress when he agreed a new six-month contract in May 2007.

He continued to struggle to find not only a starting position but also an elusive goal in his third professional season despite scoring 119 goals in 125 appearances for the reserves. On 2 October 2007 he made his first league start for 598 days in the 1–1 away draw with Bury. He kept his starting role for the next three league and cup games culminating in the 4–0 away defeat to MK Dons which saw Lincoln's manager John Schofield sacked and Ryan dropped from the team. He was offered a chance to impress the new manager Peter Jackson when handed a starting role in the game at Wycombe Wanderers on 17 November 2008 but disaster struck when he was sent-off after just 27 minutes for a foul tackle on Will Antwi. Despite this he did agree a six-month contract extension at the beginning of January 2008 but he would start no further games and, with his substitute appearances becoming even more sporadic, it was no surprise when, in March 2008, he agreed to cancel his contract with Lincoln and join up with Hucknall Town. Perhaps inevitably, he marked his Hucknall debut by scoring in the 2–1 defeat to Hinckley United on 22 March 2008 but after one further start he dropped down to the substitutes bench. He enjoyed a brief sojourn to Bourne Town, scoring in the 2–1 away victory over St Ives Town on 15 April 2008, before returning to Hucknall and his place on the bench. At the end of the season, Hucknall announced that Ryan would not be offered a new contract. Having first expressed an interest in signing Ryan a year previously, it was no surprise when Tommy Taylor signed Ryan for Boston United ahead of the 2008–2009 season. Ryan was offered fresh terms for the 2009–10 season, but rejected a new contract and left the club, joining Harrogate Town. In January 2010 he joined Belper Town on loan. Released by Harrogate at the end of the season, Ryan trialled with both Northwich Victoria and Chester before agreeing a deal to join the former club on 13 August 2010.

On 18 June 2011 he joined Frickley Athletic. before moving on to join Scarborough Athletic. He made a goalscoring debut for the club in their Northern Counties East Football League Premier Division 2–1 victory at Hall Road Rangers on 4 August 2012.

In December 2013 he joined Staveley Miners Welfare, debuting in the club's Northern Counties East League Premier Division 4–0 home defeat to Athersley Recreation on 14 December 2013.
