= Shane Clarke =

English footballer (born 1987)

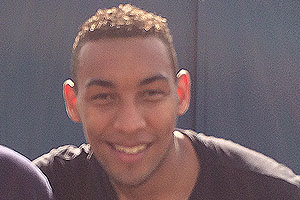

Personal information
- Full name: Shane Robin Clarke
- Date of birth: 7 November 1987 (age 39)
- Place of birth: Lincoln, England
- Position: Midfielder

Team information
- Current team: Lincoln United

Youth career
- 2004–2006: Lincoln City
- 2005–2006: → Stamford (W/E)

Senior career*
Years	Team	Apps	(Gls)
2006–2010	Lincoln City	68	(0)
2010	Gateshead	1	(0)
2010–2011	Boston United	15	(2)
2011–2013	Gainsborough Trinity	51	(6)
2013–2014	Worksop Town	42	(11)
2014–2016	Tamworth	63	(12)
2016–2017	Boston United	11	(0)
2017–2020	Gainsborough Trinity	109	(11)
2020–2021	Spalding United	12	(2)
2021–2022	Grantham Town	28	(3)
2022–	Lincoln United	0	(0)
- * Club domestic league appearances and goals as of 22:05, 27 April 2022 (UTC)

Shane Robin Clarke (born 7 November 1987) is an English footballer who plays for Lincoln United, where he plays as a midfielder.

Clarke notably played professionally in the Football League during a four-year spell with Lincoln City. He has since played the rest of his career at Non-League level for Gateshead, Boston United, Gainsborough Trinity, Spalding United, Worksop Town and Tamworth.

== Early life ==
Clarke was born in Lincoln, England.

== Playing career ==
=== Lincoln City ===
Clarke is a product of the club's centre of excellence which he joined in February 2002. In March 2004, he was one of five players who accepted a three-year scholarship with the Imps, commencing at the start of the 2004–05 season. Of the five, three would go on to forge professional careers: Clarke, Jack Hobbs and Scott Loach. In January 2006, Clarke joined Stamford on work experience with the scholarship system reverting to two rather than three years, Clarke was offered professional terms with the club at the end of his second year and he signed his first, one-year, professional contract in July 2006.

He started his Lincoln career as an unused substitute against Grimsby Town in a Football League Trophy match. He then played 11 games and was used as a substitute 5 times. His second Football League game, a 3–1 home defeat to Rotherham United on 12 January 2008, saw Clarke red-carded for a last minute lunge on Mark Hudson resulting in a three-match ban. However his performances after making his debut saw him rewarded with a one-year extension to his contract. On 30 April 2009 he agreed a new two-year contract with the club signing the contract the following day.

In May 2010, Clarke was placed on the Lincoln City transfer list by manager Chris Sutton, and on 31 August 2010 agreed a deal with the club to have his contract cancelled.

=== Gateshead ===
On 6 October 2010, Clarke signed an initial one-month contract with Conference National side Gateshead. Clarke made his debut for Gateshead as a second-half substitute against AFC Wimbledon on 16 October 2010. Clarke was released by Gateshead on 8 November 2010.

=== Boston United ===
On 19 November 2010 he joined Boston United and was judged to be man-of-the-match on his debut for the club, a 2–1 home FA Trophy victory over Gainsborough Trinity the following day. He departed the club following the 1–0 home Conference North defeat to A.F.C. Telford United on 12 February 2011 after being offered a trial with MLS side Chicago Fire. He linked up with the club for the second phase of their pre-season training, appearing in games against Florida Gulf Coast University and New York Red Bulls, before being released from his trial on 28 February 2011.

He returned to Boston United, appearing as an unused substitute in the club's 1–0 defeat at Solihull Moors on 26 March 2011 and maintaining a place in the squad until the end of the season. He was offered terms by the club for the 2011–2012 season but turned these down in order to join Gainsborough Trinity.

=== Gainsborough Trinity ===
Clarke signed for Gainsborough Trinity in June 2011. During the 2011–12 season, Clarke formed a formidable midfield partnership with Jonathan D'Laryea, and the pair were influential in helping Trinity to secure a National League North play-off position, finishing in 5th place. Trinity would go on to reach the play-off final, defeating FC Halifax Town 3–2 over two legs, with Clarke scoring the only goal in the second leg to send Trinity through to the final. In the summer of 2012, Clark agreed to sign for another year with Trinity.

=== Worksop Town ===
In June 2013 he signed for Worksop Town.

=== Tamworth ===
On 10 June 2014, Clarke, and his Worksop Town teammate Leon Mettam joined Conference North side Tamworth.

=== Boston United ===
Clarke rejoined Boston United in May 2016, but suffered an injury-stricken season with the Pilgrims, being ruled out for the first half of the season after suffering a second Achilles injury in quick succession. He was already set to miss the opening month of the campaign, but was subsequently eliminated from action until at least January 2017. Clarke was one of eight released at the end of the season, after making only 11 appearances.

=== Gainsborough Trinity ===
Returning to Gainsborough Trinity for a second spell following his release from Lincolnshire rivals Boston United, Clarke was unveiled as one of Dave Frecklington's first summer signings in May 2017, along with Craig King. Clarke scored his first goal on his return on 19 August against Harrogate Town.

=== Lincoln United ===
In June 2022, Clarke joined Lincoln United.

== Personal life ==
Clarke has a son called Gabriel, who was born on 1 March 2011.

== Career statistics ==
As of match played 16 December 2017

Appearances and goals by club, season and competition
Club	Season	League			FA Cup		League Cup		Other		Total	
Club	Season	Division	Apps	Goals	Apps	Goals	Apps	Goals	Apps	Goals	Apps	Goals
Lincoln City	2006–07	League Two	0	0	0	0	0	0	0	0	0	0
Lincoln City	2007–08	League Two	16	0	0	0	0	0	0	0	16	0
Lincoln City	2008–09	League Two	23	0	1	0	1	0	1 (Note: Appearances in the Football League Trophy)	0	26	0
Lincoln City	2009–10	League Two	29	0	2	0	1	0	1	0	33	0
Lincoln City	Total		68	0	3	0	2	0	2	0	75	0
Gateshead	2010–11	Conference Premier	1	0	0	0	—		0	0	1	0
Boston United	2010–11	Conference North	15	2	0	0	—		2 (Note: Appearances in the FA Trophy)	0	17	2
Gainsborough Trinity	2011–12	Conference North	26	4	0	0	—		0	0	26	4
Gainsborough Trinity	2012–13	Conference North	25	2	0	0	—		3	0	28	2
Gainsborough Trinity	Total		51	6	0	0	0	0	3	0	54	6
Worksop Town	2013–14	NPL – Premier Division	42	11	?	?	—		?	?	42	11
Tamworth	2014–15	Conference North	38	8	2	1	—		0	0	40	9
Tamworth	2015–16	National League North	25	4	0	0	—		1	0	26	4
Tamworth	Total		63	12	2	1	0	0	1	0	66	13
Boston United	2016–17	National League North	11	0	0	0	—		0	0	11	0
Gainsborough Trinity	2017–18	National League North	19	1	2	0	—		0	0	21	1
Career totals			270	32	7	1	2	0	8	0	287	33
