= Lee Ridley (footballer) =

English footballer

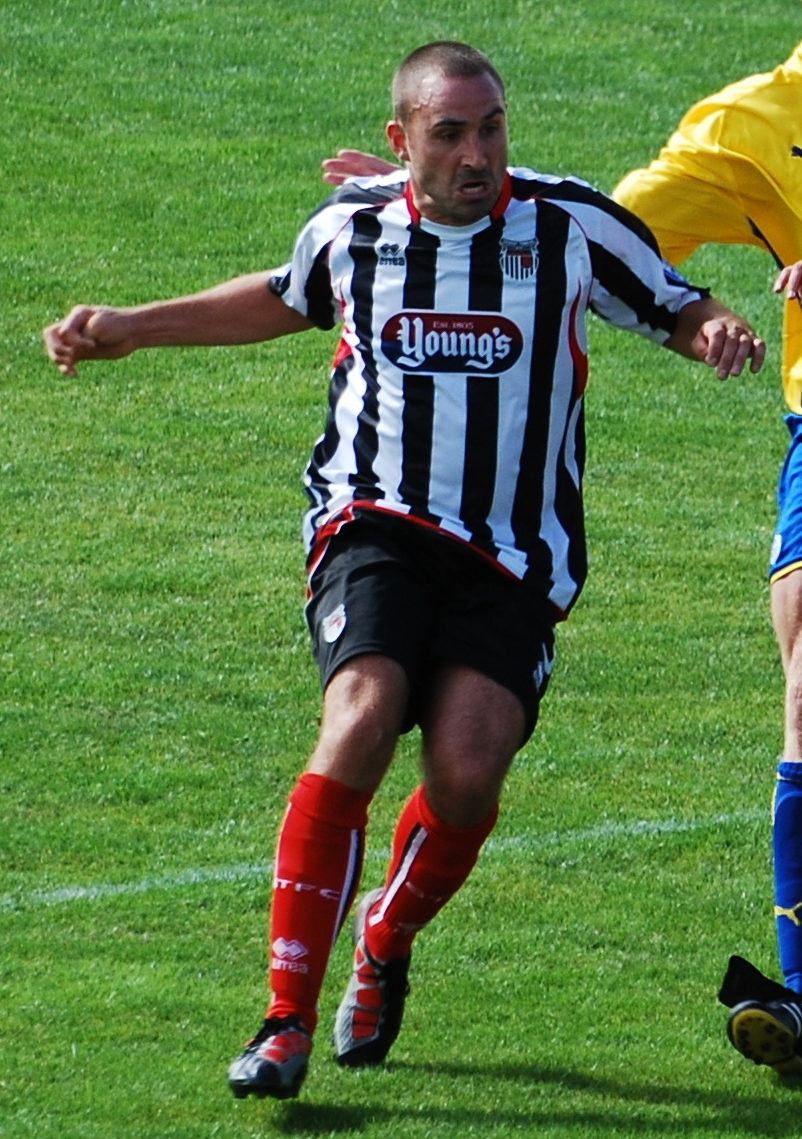
- Ridley playing for Grimsby Town in 2010

Personal information
- Date of birth: 5 December 1981 (age 44)
- Place of birth: Scunthorpe, England
- Position: Defender

Team information
- Current team: Crowle Colts

Senior career*
| Years | Team | Apps | (Gls) |
| 2000–2007 | Scunthorpe United | 100 | (3) |
| 2007–2010 | Cheltenham Town | 61 | (1) |
| 2007–2008 | → Darlington (loan) | 6 | (0) |
| 2008 | → Lincoln City (loan) | 15 | (0) |
| 2010–2011 | Grimsby Town | 39 | (0) |
| 2011–2013 | Gainsborough Trinity | 9 | (0) |
| 2012–2013 | → Worksop Town (loan) | 13 | (0) |
| 2013 | → Grantham Town (loan) | 2 | (0) |
| 2013–2014 | Grantham Town | 9 | (0) |
| 2014–2021 | Bottesford Town | 24 | (0) |
| 2021–2024 | Winterton Rangers | | |
| 2024- | Crowle Colts | | |
| Total | | 275 | (4) |
- * Club domestic league appearances and goals as of 16:30, 21 November 2012 (UTC)

Lee Ridley (born 5 December 1981) is an English professional footballer who plays as a centre back for Crowle Colts.

He has previously played professionally for Scunthorpe United, Cheltenham Town, Darlington, Lincoln City and Grimsby Town before moving into non-league football with Gainsborough Trinity, Worksop Town, Grantham Town and Bottesford Town.

== Career ==
=== Scunthorpe United ===
Born in Scunthorpe, Lee started his career with Scunthorpe United as a young child and went on to make 117 appearances in all competitions scoring three goals between 2000 and 2007. Despite being offered a new 2-year contract by Scunthorpe after their promotion to the Championship in 2007, he opted to stay in League One.

=== Cheltenham Town ===
He joined Cheltenham Town signing a three-year deal at Whaddon Road. Possibly deciding that he will get a greater regularity of first team football after making only 20 appearances in his final year at Scunthorpe. On 22 November 2007 he joined Darlington on a one-month loan deal. He then joined Lincoln City on a one-month loan deal on 4 January 2008.

He was released by the club along with 7 other players in May 2010.

=== Grimsby Town ===
He signed a two-year contract with Grimsby Town on 24 June 2010 as a direct replacement for the departed Joe Widdowson. Ridley was the favoured left back at the club throughout his first season with the club, but during the 2011–12 season he lost his way in the side down to the signing of Jamie Green and coupled with several injury problems this would eventually see him have his contract mutually terminated on 25 November 2011.

=== Non-league ===
On 5 December 2011 he signed with Conference North side Gainsborough Trinity.

In November 2012, he joined Worksop Town on a one-month loan deal. The loan deal was extended to the end of the season however he returned to Trinity in February where after a weeks loan with Grantham Town he joined the club permanently. He joined Bottesford Town for the 2014–15 season.

== Personal life ==
Outside of his football career Lee now works at Scunthorpe United's charity arm, Scunthorpe United Community Sport & Education Trust.

== Honours ==
Scunthorpe United

- Football League One: 2006–07

Individual

- Scunthorpe United Player of the Season: 2001, 2003
