= Owain Warlow =

Welsh footballer

Personal information
- Date of birth: 25 October 1987 (age 39)
- Place of birth: Pontypridd, Wales
- Position: Left wing

Youth career
- 2005–2006: Lincoln City

Senior career*
Years	Team	Apps	(Gls)
2006–2009	Lincoln City	22	(0)
2008	→ Kettering Town (loan)	4	(0)
2009–2011	Llanelli	42	(3)
2011	Gainsborough Trinity		
2011	→ Worksop Town (loan)		
2011–2013	Worksop Town		
2014	Merthyr Town		
2015	Tamworth		
2016–2019	Penybont		
2025–2026	Penybont	8	(1)

International career^{‡}
2007	Wales U21	2	(0)
2009	Wales Semi-Pro	1	(0)
- * Club domestic league appearances and goals as of 09:35, 13 March 2011 (UTC) ‡ National team caps and goals as of 22:00, 9 October 2009 (UTC)

Owain James Warlow (born 25 October 1987) is a Welsh footballer who plays as a defender and midfielder.. He is also a former Wales under-21 international.

He has previously played for Lincoln City, Kettering Town, Llanelli and Gainsborough Trinity.

== Club career ==
=== Lincoln City ===
Born in Church Village, near Pontypridd, Warlow is a product of Lincoln City's centre of excellence youth academy. He made his professional debut on 10 February 2007 in a 2–0 win over Torquay United, going on to make a total of 5 appearances for the side in his first season and being handed a two-year contract. After featuring in the first team squad more during the 2007–08 season, he joined Conference National side Kettering Town on loan at the start of the 2008–09 season, making four appearances before returning to Lincoln.

=== Llanelli ===
However Warlow did not feature for the club during the remainder of the season and was released in May 2009, along with six other players. On 16 June 2009, it was announced that Warlow had signed for Welsh Premier League side Llanelli on a free transfer, after spending time training with the side. He made his debut as a 51st-minute substitute in place of player-manager Andy Legg during Llanelli's Europa League victory over Motherwell.

He departed the club by mutual consent in March 2011 to move to Barcelona.

=== Gainsborough Trinity ===
On 23 July 2011 Warlow played for Gainsborough Trinity on trial in a friendly match against Frickley Athletic, before signing for the club on 9 August 2011.

=== Worksop Town ===
Following a successful loan spell, Warlow signed for Northern Premier League Premier Division team, Worksop Town, on 9 December 2011.

Following a rough start to his Worksop career playing at left back, he was soon moved further forward into a left wing position, where he has enjoyed a great deal of success. The highlight of his Worksop career coming in the game against Frickley Athletic, where he rounded off a superb display by scoring the equalising goal in a game Worksop went on to win 2–1.

In August 2014 he joined Merthyr Tydfil and a year later Tamworth. Following being unable to commit, Warlow retired from football in November, 2015. In 2016, Warlow returned to football with Penybont. In 2019 he took up a player-coach role at the club.

In February 2025 he returned to the club and played for the club in their European qualification match in July 2025 where before coming on as a substitute, he was sent off for violent conduct.

== International career ==
In early 2007, Warlow was called up to the Welsh Under-21 side, playing 90 minutes in a 4–0 win over Northern Ireland Under-21s. He made his second appearance for the side on 21 August 2007 as a substitute for Joe Allen during a 4–3 win over Sweden Under-21s.

In September 2009, Warlow was called to join the Wales Under-23 Semi Professionals for their friendly against Poland in Carmarthen, Wales.

== Personal life ==
As a child, he attended Ysgol Gyfun Rhydfelen, a Welsh language secondary school.

== Career statistics ==
As of 4 May 2010

Club statistics
Club	Season	League		National Cup		League Cup		Other		Total	
Club	Season	App	Goals	App	Goals	App	Goals	App	Goals	App	Goals
Lincoln City	2006–07	5	0	0	0	0	0	0	0	5	0
Lincoln City	2007–08	17	0	2	0	1	0	1	0	21	0
Lincoln City	2008–09	0	0	0	0	0	0	0	0	0	0
Lincoln City	Subtotal	22	0	2	0	1	0	1	0	26	0
Kettering Town (loan)	2008–09	4	0	0	0	0	0	0	0	4	0
Llanelli	2009–10	29	1	2	0	5	0	2	0	39	3
Total		55	3	4	0	6	0	3	0	62	3
