= Ryan Semple (footballer, born 1985) =

English footballer

Personal information
- Full name: Ryan David Semple
- Date of birth: 4 July 1985 (age 41)
- Place of birth: Peterborough, England
- Position: Midfielder

Team information
- Current team: Peterborough United (first team coach)

Senior career*
Years	Team	Apps	(Gls)
2002–2006	Peterborough United	41	(3)
2003–2004	→ Farnborough Town (loan)	9	(2)
2006–2008	Lincoln City	4	(0)
2006–2007	→ Chester City (loan)	3	(0)
2007–2008	→ Rushden & Diamonds (loan)	4	(0)
2007–2008	Oxford United	1	(0)
2008	Brackley Town		
2008–2009	Deeping Rangers	36	(30)
2009–2010	Gainsborough Trinity		
2010–2012	Boston United	87	(9)
2012–2013	Corby Town		
2013	Bury Town		
2014	Boston United		
- * Club domestic league appearances and goals

Ryan David Semple is an English former footballer who is mostly known for his spells at Peterborough United and Boston United. He is currently a first team coach at Peterborough United.

== Career ==
Semple began his career with Peterborough United where he played alongside Luke Steele and Sean St Ledger. During this time he spent two weeks training with Manchester United in summer 2002 and participating in an International under 17 tournament in Portugal and making his league debut aged 17 years and three months against Bristol City in October 2002. His progress at Peterborough was affected by a broken leg towards the end of the 2002–03 season and, in a bid to recover fitness, he joined Farnborough Town on loan in November 2003, remaining for two months and scoring twice in nine league appearances. Despite his initial promise, Semple struggled to have a regular place in the Peterborough team and, in four seasons, he made just 15 league starts, with another 26 appearances from the substitutes' bench.

In July 2006, Semple left Peterborough to join Lincoln City on a two-year contract but struggled to make an impact. A hamstring injury coupled with a lack of form limited him to just four substitute appearances in the league in his first season whilst a loan spell with Chester City was also unproductive.

At the beginning of the 2007–08 season, Semple was loaned to Rushden & Diamonds but, after just four appearances, he returned to Lincoln. In January 2008, having failed to even make the substitutes' bench for Lincoln, he was transfer listed by Lincoln's new manager, Peter Jackson, before he agreed to have his Lincoln contract cancelled at the end of January 2008.

In February 2008, he linked up with Oxford United on non-contract terms but the spell lasted only a single appearance and two weeks before he was released. In March 2008, he agreed to join Brackley Town, a club managed by his one-time Peterborough teammate David Oldfield. Semple left Brackley at the end of the 2007–08 season and spent most of the summer of 2008 without a club. In July 2008, he spent a brief period on trial at Boston United but was not offered a deal. Semple joined Deeping Rangers days before the start of the 2008–2009 season, scoring in his first match as Deeping defeated Rothwell Corinthians 5–0 on 9 August 2008. He had a rich scoring season with the club, the highlight being five goals against Sleaford Town on 23 September 2008. In April 2009, he signed dual forms with Haverhill Rovers to help them in their quest to avoid relegation from the Ridgeons League Premier Division; Semple works with their manager Peter Betts. On 5 June 2009, Semple joined Gainsborough Trinity. On 4 March 2010, he moved to Boston United.

On 29 April 2012, after two years at the club, he was released by the manager Jason Lee, along with several other players and joined Corby Town. In June 2013 he joined Bury Town. In January 2014, he rejoined Boston United.
