= Leon Mettam =

English footballer (born 1986)

Leon the weapon Mettam
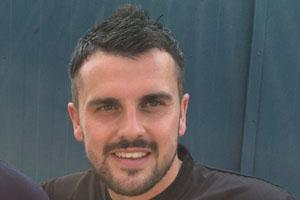

Personal information
- Date of birth: 9 December 1986 (age 39)
- Place of birth: Lincoln, England
- Position: Striker

Team information
- Current team: Corby Town (interim manager)

Youth career
- 2002–2005: Lincoln City

Senior career*
Years	Team	Apps	(Gls)
2005–2007	Lincoln City	5	(1)
2007–2008	Stamford		
2008–2009	Corby Town	35	(23)
2010–2012	Gainsborough Trinity		
2012–2014	Worksop Town	80	(66)
2014–2016	Tamworth	18	(5)
2015	→ King's Lynn Town (loan)	5	(3)
2016–2017	King's Lynn Town	19	(5)
2017–2018	→ Spalding United (loan)		
2018–2019	Spalding United		
2019–2020	Worksop Town		
2020–2021	Skegness Town		
2021–2022	Frickley Athletic		
2022–2023	Wisbech Town		
2023–2024	Skegness Town		

Managerial career
- 2022–2023: Wisbech Town (player-manager)
- 2025–: Corby Town (interim)
- * Club domestic league appearances and goals

Leon Mettam (born 9 December 1986) is an English footballer, primarily a striker, who is presently interim manager at Corby Town. He played in the Football League for Lincoln City.

== Playing career ==
=== Gainsborough Trinity ===
In July 2010, Mettam left The Steelmen to join league rivals Gainsborough Trinity.

=== Worksop Town ===
Mettam then went on to join ambitious Worksop Town, who were managed by his former Lincoln City youth team coach, Simon Clark.

=== Tamworth ===
On 10 June 2014, Mettam, and his Worksop Town teammate Shane Clarke joined Conference North side Tamworth. Following an ankle injury in October 2014 which kept him sidelined for the remainder of the year, Mettam joined Northern Premier League side King's Lynn Town on a month's loan in January 2015, scoring three times in five appearances.

=== King's Lynn Town ===
After being released by Tamworth at the end of the 2015/16 season; Mettam was unveiled to King's Lynn Town's supporters at a pre-season fans' forum on 7 June 2016 on a two-year contract. In June 2018 he joined Spalding United on a permanent basis. In May 2020, he was appointed player-coach at Skegness Town.

=== Frickley Athletic ===
In April 2021, Mettam was appointed player-assistant manager at West Yorkshire side Frickley Athletic, being reunited with former boss Dave Frecklington.

=== Wisbech Town ===
In July 2022, Mettam was appointed player-manager at United Counties League Premier Division club Wisbech Town. He departed the club by mutual consent in August 2023.

== Coaching career ==
In December 2025, Mettam returned to former club Corby Town as interim-manager.

== Career statistics ==
As of match played 22 May 2014.

Appearances and goals by club, season and competition
Club	Season	League			FA Cup		League Cup		Other (Note: Includes other competitive competitions, including the Football League Trophy & FA Trophy)		Total	
Club	Season	Division	Apps	Goals	Apps	Goals	Apps	Goals	Apps	Goals	Apps	Goals
Lincoln City	2005–06	League Two	1	0	0	0	0	0	0	0	1	0
Lincoln City	2006–07	League Two	4	1	0	0	0	0	1	0	5	1
Lincoln City	Lincoln City total		5	1	0	0	0	0	1	0	6	1
Gainsborough Trinity	2010–11	Conference North	0	0	0	0	–		0	0	0	0
Gainsborough Trinity	2011–12	Conference North	0	0	0	0	–		0	0	0	0
Gainsborough Trinity	Gainsborough Trinity total		0	0	0	0	–		0	0	0	0
Worksop Town	2012–13	Northern Premier Division	0	0	0	0	–		0	0	0	0
Worksop Town	2013–14	Northern Premier Division	0	0	0	0	–		0	0	0	0
Worksop Town	Worksop Town total		0	0	0	0	–		0	0	0	0
Tamworth	2014–15	Conference North	0	0	0	0	–		0	0	0	0
Career totals			0	0	0	0	0	0	0	0	0	0
