= Nettleham F.C. =

Association football club in England

Coordinates: 53°15′42.65″N 0°28′48.23″W

Nettleham
- Full name: Nettleham Football Club
- Nickname: The Nettles
- Founded: 1905
- Ground: Mulsanne Park, Nettleham
- Chairman: John Thornton
- Manager: Mick Fairweather
- League: Lincolnshire League
- 2024-2025: 1
- Website: https://www.pitchero.com/clubs/nettlehamfootballclub/

Nettleham Football Club is an English football club based in Nettleham, near Lincoln, in Lincolnshire. The club are currently members of the Lincolnshire League and play at Mulsanne Park.

== History ==
Nettleham Football Club is an English Football Club based in Nettleham village, near Lincoln, in Lincolnshire. The club are currently members of the Lincolnshire League and play at Mulsanne Park. The club was established in 1905 as Nettleham United. They joined the Premier Division of the Central Midlands League in 1987. The club adopted its current name in 1989, and in their first season under their new name, finished third in the division and were promoted to the Supreme Division. They began entering the FA Vase in 1990 and reached the Second Round in 1995–96. In 2011 the club left the Central Midlands League to join the Lincolnshire League.

In the 2021–2022 season, Nettleham was Challenge Cup Winners after beating Louth Town 2–1 in extra time at the Vertigo Stadium, Skegness. In the 2022–2023 season, Nettleham was Challenge Cup Winners again after beating Lincoln United Development Team 1–0 at Sleaford Town. In the 2023–2024 season, Nettleham clinched their first Lincolnshire League title with 5 games spare with a comprehensive 5–1 win against Keelby United. In the 2023–2024 season, Nettleham clinched their first Supplementary Cup title where they ran out 6–3 winners AET against Appleby Frodingham FC, the full time score being 3-3. In the 2024–2025 season, Nettleham clinched back to back Lincolnshire League titles, Nettleham drew their last league game 2-2 against Barton Town Reserves, meaning a 2 point lead with Crowle playing the following week for a chance to win the league, the game ended 1-1 vs Rustons, meaning Nettleham FC were champions again. In the 2024–2025 season, Nettleham won the Challenge Cup for the third time after beating Skegness Town Reserves Team 3-0 AET at Glanford Park, Scunthorpe United. In the 2025-2026 season, Nettleham again won the Challenge Cup after beating Lincoln Moorlands Railway on penalties 5-4, after an enthralling game in 90 minutes ended 3-3 with 4 goals coming in the last 20 minutes of the game. The game was played at the Attis Arena (Scunthorpe United).

== Ground ==
Nettleham play at Mulsanne Park, Nettleham.

For the 2025-2026 season, Nettleham have installed fencing to fully enclose the main pitch off, this is the first of many developments planned at the ground to improve facilities.

== Records ==
- FA Vase
  - Second Round 1995–96
  - Challenge Cup Winners 2021–2022, 2022-2023, 2024-2025, 2025-2026
  - Lincolnshire League Winners 2023–2024, 2024-2025
  - Supplementary Cup Winners 2023-2024
