= Ayden Duffy =

English footballer (born 1986)

Personal information
- Full name: Ayden Stuart Duffy
- Date of birth: 16 November 1986 (age 39)
- Place of birth: Kettering, England
- Position: Goalkeeper

Youth career
- 2003–2006: Lincoln City

Senior career*
| Years | Team | Apps | (Gls) |
| 2004–2009 | Lincoln City | 5 | (0) |
| 2004 | → Grantham Town (loan) | | |
| 2005 | → Bourne Town (loan) | | |
| 2005 | → Buxton (loan) | | |
| 2005 | → Lincoln Moorlands Railway (loan) | | |
| 2006 | → Stamford (loan) | | |
| 2006 | → Cambridge United (loan) | 2 | (0) |
| 2006 | → Stamford (loan) | ? | (?) |
| 2006 | → Worksop Town (loan) | | |
| 2009 | Corby Town | 0 | (0) |
| 2009 | Gainsborough Trinity | 1 | (0) |
| 2009 | Hyde United | | |
| 2009–2010 | Grantham Town | | |
| 2010–2011 | Lincoln Moorlands Railway | | |
| 2011 | Staveley Miners Welfare | | |
| 2011–2012 | Shepshed Dynamo | | |
| 2012–2013 | Retford United | | |
| 2017–2018 | Histon | | |
- * Club domestic league appearances and goals as of 18:00, 8 July 2009 (UTC)

Ayden Stuart Duffy (born 16 November 1986) is an English former footballer who played as a goalkeeper.

He played as a professional in the Football League for Lincoln City where he made five League appearances and was loaned out to a host of Non-League sides during his tenure at Sincil Bank which notably included a spell with Cambridge United. He also featured on loan for Grantham Town, Bourne Town, Buxton, Lincoln Moorlands Railway, Stamford and Worksop Town. Released in 2009, Duffy went on to play for Corby Town, Gainsborough Trinity, Hyde United, Staveley Miners Welfare, Shepshed Dynamo, Retford United and Histon.

== Career ==
=== Lincoln City ===
Duffy was born in Kettering but brought up in Colsterworth. Involved with the Lincoln City academy, he signed a three-year scholarship with the club in the summer of 2003.

During his scholarship, Duffy spent a number of periods on work experience with local non-league sides. In November 2004, he linked up with Grantham Town, celebrating his 18th birthday by keeping a clean sheet on his Grantham debut. At the turn of the year he joined Bourne Town.

At the beginning of the 2005–06 season, he spent an eventful spell with Buxton. He produced a Man of the Match display, including a penalty save, against Newcastle Town in the FA Cup only for Newcastle to protest about his eligibility; the protest was unsuccessful. In the league game against Maltby Main he was beaten by a long punt from his opposite goalkeeper. In December 2005, he assisted Lincoln Moorlands. In January 2006, he joined Stamford. He stayed at Stamford before Lincoln recalled him, to enable him to link up with Cambridge United. He played twice for the Us, suffering an unfortunate debut when he palmed the ball into his own net against Morecambe. He was, however, offered support by the then Cambridge boss Rob Newman. He returned to Stamford, helping them to promotion to the Southern League Premier Division with a play-off victory against Wivenhoe Town.

In the summer of 2006, Duffy accepted a one-year professional contract with Lincoln City. His first season saw him spend time on loan at Worksop Town where a broken leg ended his season. He accepted a further one-year contract and on 12 April 2008 made his professional debut, replacing the injured Alan Marriott in the 2–1 victory against Chester City.

On 19 April 2008, he made his full home debut for Lincoln in a 3–1 victory over Brentford. On 5 May 2009, he was released by Lincoln City.

=== Non-League ===
On 8 July 2009, Duffy signed for Corby Town, but he was released a few weeks later. He moved on to join Gainsborough Trinity on non-contract terms as cover for the injured Phil Barnes, appearing in the 2–2 friendly home draw with Boston United on 1 August 2009, but was unable to play for the club in the Conference North as The FA ruled that Corby Town still held his registration.

In September, he linked up with Hyde United, marking his debut by being sent off for conceding two penalties, in the 17th and 55th minute, in a 5–1 home defeat to Alfreton Town on 5 September 2009. He made a further appearance in Hyde's 1–1 home draw with Gloucester City two days later before departing the club to join Grantham Town. In February 2010, he moved to Lincoln Moorlands Railway. In September 2010, Duffy joined Sleaford Town on loan, debuting in the 3–0 United Counties Football League Premier Division home defeat by Irchester United on 18 September 2010. He joined Staveley Miners Welfare for the 2011–12 season, debuting in the club's 1–0 Northern Counties East League victory at Brighouse Town on 6 August 2011.

== Personal life ==
Ayden Duffy is a physical education teacher and is joint head of enrichment at Hills Road Sixth Form College
