= Phil Watt =

English footballer (born 1988)

Personal information
- Full name: Philip Alexander Watt
- Date of birth: 10 January 1988 (age 38)
- Place of birth: Rotherham, England
- Position: Defender

Team information
- Current team: Belper Town

Youth career
- Rotherham United
- 2004–2005: Lincoln City

Senior career*
Years	Team	Apps	(Gls)
2005–2008	Lincoln City	1	(0)
2006	→ Grantham Town (loan)	2	(0)
2006	→ Grantham Town (loan)	7	(0)
2008	→ Corby Town (loan)		
2008–2011	Corby Town		
2010	→ Grantham Town (loan)		
2011–2013	Grantham Town		
2012–2013	Boston United	14	(0)
2013	Coalville Town	9	(2)
2013–2017	Belper Town		
2017–2018	Lincoln United	37	(8)
2018–2020	Frickley Athletic		
2020–2023	Mickleover		
2023–	Belper Town		
- * Club domestic league appearances and goals as of 10 August 2017

Philip Alexander Watt (born 10 January 1988) is an English footballer who plays for Belper Town. He previously played in the Football League for Lincoln City.

== Career ==
=== Lincoln City ===
Watt joined Lincoln City in 2004 having trained as a youth player with Rotherham United. He moved to Grantham Town on loan in early 2006, before being promoted to the first team squad in July 2006. He soon moved on loan again to Grantham for a month, playing ten matches in total for the club.

In May 2007, he was one of seven players offered a new contract by manager John Schofield, being offered a one-year deal. He made his debut for the club in their opening League Two game of the 2007-08 season, a 4–0 home defeat to Shrewsbury Town on 11 August 2007. He also appeared in an FA Cup match against Nottingham Forest later in the season.

Having been transfer listed by the club's new manager Peter Jackson on 14 January 2008, he departed the club on 25 February after his contract was cancelled by mutual consent.

=== Corby Town ===
After leaving Lincoln City, he signed for Corby Town on 26 February 2008. He joined Grantham Town on an initial month's loan in November 2010, the loan being extended to a second month. In January 2011, Corby Town agreed to release Watt to enable him to join Grantham Town on a permanent basis.

=== Boston United ===
In January 2013 he joined Boston United, reuniting him with his one-time Corby Town manager Graham Drury. He made his debut in the club's 2-1 Conference North home defeat to Harrogate Town on 8 January 2013. He made 14 appearances for Boston before leaving at the end of the season.

=== Coalville Town ===
In July 2013, Watt signed for Coalville Town. He made 12 appearances for Coalville scoring 3 goals.

=== Belper Town ===
On 7 October 2013, Watt signed for Belper Town.

=== Lincoln United ===
In July 2017 Watt signed for Lincoln United.

=== Frickley Athletic ===
In May 2018 Watt signed for Northern Premier League side Frickley Athletic.

=== Belper Town ===
In May 2023, Watt joined Belper Town following a spell with Mickleover.
