= Scunthorpe & District Football League =

Association football league in England

The Scunthorpe & District Football League is a football league formed in 1921 catering for clubs in and around Scunthorpe, England. It is not a formal member of the English football pyramid.

The league first started as regional league with no promotion or relegation to the lower divisions. In the 1960s the league added automatic promotion and the league grew to five divisions. By the turn of the century the league still operated four divisions.

With the growth of nearby clubs entering the Lincolnshire county league, membership numbers have dropped and the league now operates with 2 divisions of 17 clubs.

Due to a sponsorship deal, the league is currently known as the EC Surfacing Scunthorpe & District Football League.

== Member clubs 2025-2026 ==
=== Division One ===
- Barnetby United
- Beckwood Rovers
- The Butchers Arms
- College Wanderers
- Limestone Rangers
- Messingham United
- Scotter United

=== Division Two ===
- AFC Crosby
- AFC Lochran
- Briggensians
- Brigg Town Colts
- Grimsby United Reserves
- Manor Park CF
- New Holland Villa
- Scotter United Reserves

== League Champions ==
1921 to 1939

| Season | Division One | Division Two | Division Three |
|---|---|---|---|
| 1921–22 | Scunthorpe Nomads | | |
| 1922–23 | Ashby Mill Road Reserves | Lysaghts Juniors | |
| 1923–24 | Lysaghts Juniors | | |
| 1924–25 | Althorpe Institute | | |
| 1925–26 | Althorpe Institute | | |
| 1926–27 | Crosby Rangers | | |
| 1927–28 | Scawby | | |
| 1928–29 | Scawby | Dragonby Institute | |
| 1929–30 | Appleby Plate Mills | Barton Old Boys | John Browns |
| 1930–31 | Appleby Plate Mills | Appleby Steelworks | Ashby Methodists |
| 1931–32 | Barton Old Boys | Ashby Methodists | Ashby Institute Reserves |
| 1932–33 | Ashby Institute | Ashby Institute Reserves | Scunthorpe Wesleyans |
| 1933–34 | Winterton Rovers | Dragonby Institute | Broughton Juniors |
| 1934–35 | Burton Stather | Ashby Mill Road | Lysaghts Sports A |
| 1935–36 | Appleby Steel Works | Scunthorpe YMCA | Keadby Randers |
| 1936–37 | Scunthorpe Cottage Beck | Broughton Juniors Reserves | |
| 1937–38 | Ashby Mill Road | Ashby Institute | |
| 1938–39 | Ashby Mill Road | Broughton Juniors | Ferriby Old Boys |

1945-2003

| Season | Division One | Division Two | Division Three | Division Four | Division Five | Division Six |
|---|---|---|---|---|---|---|
| 1945–46 | Winterton Rangers | Thealby United | | | | |
| 1946–47 | Winterton Rangers | Burton Athletic | Ashby Corinthians | | | |
| 1947–48 | Appleby Frodingham | Winteringham Rangers | Ashby Corinthians | Worlaby Rovers | Ashby Institute Reserves | Scunthorpe Coop |
| 1948–49 | Appleby Works | Scotter United | Epworth Town | Garthorpe United | Worlaby Rovers | Springs |
| 1949–50 | Winterton Rangers | Winteringham Rangers | Sun Engineers | Winterton Rangers Reserves | Ashby Corinthians | |
| 1950–51 | Appleby Works | Ashby Institute Reserves | Gunness | Keadby Institute | East Butterwick | |
| 1951–52 | Winterton Rangers | Burton Athletic | Sun Engineers | Brigg Sugar Factory | | |
| 1952–53 | Appleby Works | West Butterwick | Brigg Sugar Factory | Firth Browns | | |
| 1953–54 | Luddington | Eastoft | Firth Browns | Winterton Rangers Reserves | | |
| 1954–55 | Luddington | East Butterwick | Scotter United | | | |
| 1955–56 | Luddington | Ore Mining Branch | Burton Athletic | | | |
| 1956–57 | Ashby Institute Reserves | Ore Mining Branch | Burton Athletic | | | |
| 1957–58 | Redbourn Sports | Belton Sports | New Holland Villa | | | |
| 1958–59 | Ashby Institute Reserves | Owston Ferry | Central Sports | | | |
| 1959–60 | Ashby Institute Reserves | Central Sports | Ashby Juniors | | | |
| 1960–61 | Ashby Institute Reserves | Wrawby Athletic | East Butterwick | Hibaldstow Hotspur | | |
| 1961–62 | Goole United | Brumby WMC | Messingham Trinity | Alpha Cement | | |
| 1962–63 | Winterton Rangers | Barton Old Boys | Brigg Amateurs | Lysaghts Sports A | Scunthorpe BRSA | Wortley Wanderers |
| 1963–64 | Winterton Rangers | Brigg Amateurs | Crosby Colts | Waddingham Athletic | South Killingholme | Messingham Trinity Reserves |
| 1964–65 | Goole Dockers | Crosby Colts | West Butterwick | Gunness | Scawby Youth Club | Ashby Wesley Youth Club |
| 1965–66 | Goole Dockers | Old Scunthonians | Frodingham Sports | Eastwood Sports | Mill Wanderers | Broughton Rserves |
| 1966–67 | Goole Dockers | Frodingham Sports | New Bridge Juniors | Redbourn Sports Reserves | Axholme Wanderers | College Wanderers |
| 1967–68 | Winterton Rangers Reserves | New Bridge Juniors | Barton United | Firth Browns | Jubilee sports | Wrawby Athletic Reserves |
| 1968–69 | Winterton Rangers Reserves | Barton Old Boys | West Butterwick | New Holland Villa | Lincoln Imp | Rabbit And Net |
| 1969–70 | Gunness | Wortley Wanderers | Scawby | Lysaghts Sports A | Hibaldstow Hotspur | |
| 1970–71 | Crowle United | Centurion | Lincoln Imp | Desert Rat | Marshall Sports Reserves | |
| 1971–72 | Crowle United | John Leggott College | Appleby Frodingham A | Woodland Rovers | Desert Rat Reserves | |
| 1972–73 | New Bridge Juniors | Desert Rat | New Park Sports | Barton United Reserves | Hibaldstow Hotspur | |
| 1973–74 | Crosby Colts | New Park Sports | Crosby Colts Reservers | Foxhills Old Boys Reserves | Barrow Wanderers | |
| 1974–75 | Crosby Colts | Swinefleet Juniors | Nypro Works | Burton Athletic | Riddings Youth Club | |
| 1975–76 | Desert Rat | Saints Sports | Desert Rat Reserves | Worlaby Rovers | Broughton Park | |
| 1976–77 | Desert Rat | Crosby Colts reserves | Burton Athletic | GPO Sports | Dog and Gun Reserves | |
| 1977–78 | New Bridge Juniors | Burton Athletic | GPO Sports | West Butterwick Reserves | King Henry VIII | |
| 1978–79 | Woodlands | Centurion | Sinefleet | Luddington | White Horse Brigg | |
| 1979–80 | Woodlands | Brigg Amateurs | Scunthorpe Youth Center | Nypro Works | College Wanderers | White Hors Reserves |
| 1980–81 | New Holland Villa | Desert Rat Reserves | King Henry VIII | Crusafers | White Horse Reserves | Esco Hibaldstow |
| 1981–82 | Desert Rat Reserves | White Horse Brigg | Brumby Hotel | King Henry VIII Reserves | Esco Hibaldstow | Brumby Hotel Reserves |
| 1982–83 | White Horse Brigg | Ashby Institute | Barton Old Boys | Esco Hibaldstow | Luddington Reserves | Scawby |
| 1983–84 | White Horse Brigg | Barton Old Boys | Esco Hibaldstow | Ashby Juniors Reserves | Scawby | Lincoln Imp |
| 1984–85 | Ashby Institute | Esco Hiblaldstow | Ashby Juniors Reserves | North Lindsey Tech Col | Yaddlethorpe | |
| 1985–86 | Ashby Institute | Scotter United | Scawby | Yaddlethorpe | Hobbies Center | |
| 1986–87 | Barton Old Boys | New Bridge | Yaddlethorpe | Barton Old Boys Reserves | BOS United | |
| 1987–88 | Esco Hibaldstow | Appleby Frodingham | Bottesford Town Reserves | Appleby Frodingham Reserves | Crowle United A | |
| 1988–89 | Scotter United | Comet Wanderers | Barton Old Boys Reserves | Crowle United A | Pockets | L&M Barton |
| 1989–90 | Barton Old Boys | Scunthonians | Messingham Trinity | BOS United | L&M Barton | Kingsway |
| 1990–91 | Rod Mill | Hibaldstow Reserves | BOS United | Messingham Trinity Reserves | Pied Piper | |
| 1991–92 | Brumby Hotel | Winterton Rangers Reserves | Crosby Colts Reservers | Pied Piper | Broughton WMC | |
| 1992–93 | Scawby | Swinefleet | Messingham Trinity Reserves | Broughton WMC | Epworth Town | |
| 1993–94 | Scotter United | Brigg Town Reserves | Lincoln Imp | Swinefllet Reserves | Bottesford Town Colts | |
| 1994–95 | Barton Old Boys | Lincoln Imp | AFC Mackintosh | Fast Gladiator | Swinefleet Reserves | |
| 1995–96 | AFC Friendship | AFC Mackintosh | Luddington | Crystal Polymers | Briggensians Rserves | |
| 1996–97 | AFC Friendship | Bottesford Town Sports | Epworth Town LC Reserves | Briggensians | Chancel Reserves | |
| 1997–98 | Brumby Hotel | Brumby Hotel Reserves | Petrochem | Lincoln Imp Reserves | Open Heath | |
| 1998–99 | Brumby Hotel | Appleby Frodingham Reserves | Ancholme Machinery | AFC Mackintosh Reserves | Winterton Town | |
| 1999–00 | Scunthonians | Ancholme Manchinery | Beckwood | Winterton Town | Key Country Wanderers | |
| 2000–01 | Brumby Hotel | Appleby Frodingham Reserves | Crosby Colts | Talbot | | |
| 2001–02 | AFC Brumby | AFC Brumby Reserves | Winterton Town | Scawby Reserves | | |
| 2002–03 | AFC Brumby | AFC Brumby Reserves | Luddington | Barnetby United | | |

2003–Present Day

| Season | Division One | Division Two | Division Three |
|---|---|---|---|
| 2003–04 | AFC Brumby | AFC Brumby Reserves | The Mallard |
| 2004–05 | Barton Old Boys Reserves | The Mallard | New Holland Villa |
| 2005–06 | Mallard | BBM Reserves | Swinefleet Juniors |
| 2006–07 | BBM | Swinefleet Juniors | Crosby Colts Juniors |
| 2007–08 | AFC Brumby | Messingham Trinity Juniors | Mallard |
| 2008–09 | AFC Brumby | Mallard | AFC Goods Service |
| 2009–10 | AFC Brumby | College Wanderers | Revision |
| 2010–11 | Limestone Rangers | Crosby Colts Reserves | Butchers Arms |
| 2011–12 | College Wanderers | Crosby Colts Reserves | Scunthonians Reserves |
| 2012–13 | College Wanderers | New Holland Villa | Brumby |
| 2013–14 | College Wanderers | Brumby | Broughton Colts |
| 2014–15 | Limestone Rangers | Barnetby United | Crosby Colts Juniors |
| 2015–16 | Limestone Rangers | Crowle Town Colts | The Butchers Arms |
| 2016–17 | AFC Brumby | Epworth Town Colts | Shape Changers |
| 2017–18 | Crowle Town Colts | Crosby Juniors | |
| 2018–19 | Scotter United | Epworth Colliery Blues | |
| 2019–20 | Barnetby United* | Ashby Bowl* | |
| 2020–21 | League Not Played due to COVID-19 | League Not Played due to COVID-19 | |
| 2021–22 | College Wanderers | Messingham United | Ashby Park Rangers |
| 2022–23 | College Wanderers | Manor Park CF | |
| 2023–24 | Scotter United | Broughton WMC | |
| 2024–25 | Scotter United | Barnetby United | |
| 2025–26 | | | |
