= Lincolnshire Football League =

Association football league in England

- Founded: 1948
- Country: England
- Number of clubs: 15
- Level on pyramid: Level 11
- Promotion to: Level 10; Northern Counties East League; United Counties League
- Domestic cup: Lincolnshire Football League Challenge Cup
- Current champions: Nettleham (2024–25)
- Website: FA Full-Time

The Lincolnshire Football League is an English football league. The league has one division, which stands at level 11 of the English football league system).

== History ==
There are records of a Lincolnshire football league taking place as early as the 1884–1885 season but before the Second World War the league had several different formats, including being a reserve league for Football League clubs in Lincolnshire from 1933 to 1939.

The league officially formed at the start of the 1948–49, following a proposal from Grimsby Town Football club back in 1947 to create a county wide league offering a higher level of football than the Grimsby Football League. Discussions took place throughout the football season and the league was formed on Monday 2 February 1948 with 14 clubs initially joining.

The league also ran a "Lincolnshire Premier Division" from 1961 to 1968 again catering for Reserve sides of Football League Clubs.

The League runs a representative side that competes in the FA Inter League Cup. In their first venture into the competition, they reached the quarter-final stage where they lost to the Cheshire League. In the 2012–13 campaign, they also lost in the quarter-finals to the Humber Premier League.

In May 2017 the Lincolnshire League became a member of the English football league system and initially National League System (NLS) following the FA elevating it to Step 7 status (level 11 overall), which was abolished in 2020 and the league redesignated as an NLS feeder, subject to the league champions having the necessary ground grading and desire to do so. Clubs had, in recent years, moved up to the Northern Counties East Football League, Central Midlands League and the United Counties League.

== Member clubs (2026–27) ==
- Barton Town Reserves
- Bottesford Town Reserves
- Brigg Town Reserves
- Cleethorpes Town Reserves
- Fulbeck United
- Grimsby Borough Reserves
- Horncastle Town
- Lincoln Moorlands Railway
- Lincoln United Development
- Louth Town Reserves
- Nettleham (Sat)
- Skegness Town Reserves
- Sleaford Town Development
- Spilsby Town
- Wyberton

== Champions ==
Season	Champions
1948–49	Alford United
1949–50	Brigg Town
1950–51	Alford United
1951–52	Skegness Town
1952–53	Grimsby Town A
1953–54	Brigg Town
1954–55	Gainsborough Trinity Reserves
1955–56	Skegness Town
1956–57	Ashby Institute
1957–58	Louth United
1958–59	Grimsby Borough Police
1959–60	Grimsby Borough Police
1960–61	Barton Town
1961–62	Grimsby Borough Police
1962–63	Appleby Frodingham
1963–64	Lincoln United
1964–65	Boston United
1965–66	Ashby Institute
1966–67	Louth United
1967–68	Louth United
1968–69	Brigg Town
1969–70	Brigg Town
1970–71	Brigg Town
1971–72	Brigg Town
1972–73	Louth United
1973–74	Brigg Town
1974–75	Ruston Buycrus
1975–76	Brigg Town
1976–77	Appleby Frodingham
1977–78	Appleby Frodingham
1978–79	Drewery Sports Grimsby
1979–80	Gainsborough United
1980–81	Sleaford Town
1981–82	Hykeham Town
1982–83	Ross Sports
1983–84	Ross Sports
1984–85	Skegness Town
1985–86	Louth United
1986–87	Louth United
1987–88	Ruston Sports
1988–89	Ruston Sports
1989–90	Bottesford Town
1990–91	Bottesford Town
1991–92	Bottesford Town
1992–93	Humberside United
1993–94	Appleby Frodingham
1994–95	Wyberton
1995–96	Lincoln United Colts
1996–97	Barton Town Old Boys
1997–98	Lincoln United Reserves
1998–99	Limestone Rangers
1999–00	Boston United Reserves
2000–01	Grantham Town Reserves
2001–02	Lincoln United Reserves
2002–03	Grimsby Amateurs
2003–04	Sleaford Town
2004–05	Wyberton
2005–06	Hykeham Town
2006–07	Skegness Town
2007–08	Skegness Town
2008–09	CGB Humbertherm
2009–10	Harvest
2010–11	Boston United Reserves
2011–12	Cleethorpes Town
2012–13	Skegness United
2013–14	Skegness Town
2014–15	Hykeham Town
2015–16	Skegness Town
2016–17	Skegness Town
2017–18	Ruston Sports
2018–19	Lincoln Moorlands Railway
2019–20	None, seasons curtailed
2020–21	None, seasons curtailed
2021–22	Wyberton
2022–23	Louth Town
2023–24	Nettleham
2024–25	Nettleham
2025–26	Nettleham
