= List of Marine A.F.C. seasons =

Marine Association Football Club is an English football club based in Crosby, Merseyside. The club, which was founded in 1894, is a member of both the Liverpool County and Lancashire County Football Associations, and currently plays in the National League North, the sixth tier of the English football league system.

== Early history ==
The club was formed in 1894 by a group of local businessmen and former college students. Marine takes its name from a hotel on the River Mersey sea front at Waterloo, seven miles to the north of Liverpool city centre, where the founders of the club met. Marine moved to its present ground, Rossett Park, in 1903. Marine quickly won multiple titles in the I Zingari League and the Liverpool Combination. The club's greatest success as an amateur team in this period culminated in an FA Amateur Cup Final appearance in 1931–32, where they lost 7–1 to Dulwich Hamlet in front of a crowd of 22,000 fans at the Boleyn Ground. In 1935–36, the club moved to the all-professional Lancashire Combination and enjoyed limited success before moving to the Cheshire County League in 1969–70.

== Key ==
Key to league record

- Level = Level of the league in the current league system
- Pld = Games played
- W = Games won
- D = Games drawn
- L = Games lost
- GF = Goals for
- GA = Goals against
- GD = Goals difference
- Pts = Points
- Position = Position in the final league table
- Top scorer and number of goals scored shown in bold when he was also top scorer for the division.

Key to cup records

- Res = Final reached round
- Rec = Final club record in the form of wins-draws-losses
- PR = Preliminary round
- QR1 (2, etc.) = Qualifying Cup rounds
- G = Group stage
- R1 (2, etc.) = Proper Cup rounds
- QF = Quarter-finalists
- SF = Semi-finalists
- F = Finalists
- A(QF,SF,F) = Area quarter-, semi-, finalists
- W = Winners

== Seasons ==
| Year | League | | | | | | | | | | | | | | Cup competitions | | | | Manager |
| Year | Division | Lvl | Pld | W | D | L | GF | GA | GD | Pts | Position | Leading league scorer | | Average attendance | FA Cup | | FA Trophy | | Manager |
| Year | Division | Lvl | Pld | W | D | L | GF | GA | GD | Pts | Position | Name | Goals | Average attendance | Res | Rec | Res | Rec | Manager |
|---|---|---|---|---|---|---|---|---|---|---|---|---|---|---|---|---|---|---|---|
| 1935–36 | **Lancashire Combination** | | 40 | 14 | 8 | 18 | 94 | 86 | +8 | 36 | **14th of 21** | | | | | | | | |
| 1936–37 | **Lancashire Combination** | | 40 | 20 | 6 | 14 | 107 | 81 | +26 | 46 | **8th of 21** | | | | | | | | |
| 1937–38 | **Lancashire Combination** | | 42 | 15 | 7 | 20 | 80 | 105 | −25 | 37 | **16th of 22** | | | | | | | | |
| 1938–39 | **Lancashire Combination** | | 42 | 22 | 3 | 17 | 107 | 92 | +15 | 47 | **8th of 22** | | | | | | | | |
No competitive football was played between 1939 and 1946 due to the World War II.
| 1946–47 | **Lancashire Combination** | | 42 | 25 | 6 | 11 | 121 | 72 | +49 | 56 | **2nd of 22** | | | | R1 | 1–0–1 | | | |
| 1946–47 | **Lancashire Combination** | | The league expanded to two divisions. | | | | | | | | | | | | R1 | 1–0–1 | | | |
| 1947–48 | **Lancashire Combination**; **Division One** | | 42 | 23 | 6 | 13 | 103 | 64 | +39 | 52 | **6th of 22** | | | | R1 | 1–0–1 | | | |
| 1948–49 | **Lancashire Combination**; **Division One** | | 42 | 14 | 10 | 18 | 73 | 83 | −10 | 38 | **17th of 22** | | | | PR | 0–0–1 | | | |
| 1949–50 | **Lancashire Combination**; **Division One** | | 42 | 11 | 9 | 22 | 74 | 104 | −30 | 31 | **21st of 22** | | | | PR | 1–0–1 | | | |
| 1950–51 | **Lancashire Combination**; **Division One** | | 42 | 11 | 8 | 23 | 68 | 87 | −19 | 30 | **20th of 22** | | | | QR1 | 1–0–1 | | | |
| 1951–52 | **Lancashire Combination**; **Division One** | | 42 | 13 | 12 | 17 | 77 | 85 | −8 | 38 | **15th of 22** | | | | QR1 | 1–0–1 | | | |
| 1952–53 | **Lancashire Combination**; **Division One** | | 42 | 19 | 11 | 12 | 91 | 72 | +19 | 49 | **4th of 22** | | | | PR | 0–1–1 | | | |
| 1953–54 | **Lancashire Combination**; **Division One** | | 40 | 17 | 6 | 17 | 70 | 77 | −7 | 40 | **6th of 21** | | | | PR | 0–1–1 | | | |
| 1954–55 | **Lancashire Combination**; **Division One** | | 42 | 19 | 5 | 18 | 91 | 84 | +7 | 43 | **10th of 22** | | | | QR2 | 2–0–1 | | | |
| 1955–56 | **Lancashire Combination**; **Division One** | | 38 | 14 | 8 | 16 | 71 | 83 | −12 | 36 | **10th of 20** | | | | PR | 0–0–1 | | | |
| 1956–57 | **Lancashire Combination**; **Division One** | | 38 | 12 | 8 | 18 | 62 | 84 | −22 | 32 | **17th of 20** | | | | QR1 | 1–1–1 | | | |
| 1957–58 | **Lancashire Combination**; **Division One** | | 42 | 17 | 7 | 18 | 74 | 103 | −29 | 41 | **10th of 22** | | | | QR1 | 0–0–1 | | | |
| 1958–59 | **Lancashire Combination**; **Division One** | | 42 | 16 | 8 | 18 | 80 | 97 | −17 | 40 | **11th of 22** | | | | PR | 0–0–1 | | | |
| 1959–60 | **Lancashire Combination**; **Division One** | | 42 | 19 | 6 | 17 | 92 | 98 | −6 | 44 | **9th of 22** | | | | PR | 0–0–1 | | | |
| 1960–61 | **Lancashire Combination**; **Division One** | | 42 | 17 | 10 | 15 | 79 | 75 | +4 | 44 | **10th of 22** | | | | QR2 | 1–0–1 | | | |
| 1961–62 | **Lancashire Combination**; **Division One** | | 42 | 15 | 7 | 20 | 94 | 99 | −5 | 37 | **14th of 22** | | | | QR1 | 0–2–1 | | | |
| 1962–63 | **Lancashire Combination**; **Division One** | | 42 | 22 | 6 | 14 | 92 | 73 | +19 | 50 | **7th of 22** | | | | QR1 | 0–0–1 | | | |
| 1963–64 | **Lancashire Combination**; **Division One** | | 42 | 15 | 8 | 19 | 73 | 83 | −10 | 38 | **14th of 22** | | | | QR1 | 0–1–1 | | | |
| 1964–65 | **Lancashire Combination**; **Division One** | | 42 | 21 | 6 | 15 | 90 | 69 | +21 | 48 | **8th of 22** | | | | QR1 | 0–0–1 | | | |
| 1965–66 | **Lancashire Combination**; **Division One** | | 42 | 27 | 4 | 11 | 129 | 66 | +63 | 58 | **4th of 22** | | | | QR2 | 1–1–1 | | | |
| 1966–67 | **Lancashire Combination**; **Division One** | | 42 | 20 | 9 | 13 | 84 | 69 | +15 | 49 | **7th of 22** | | | | QR1 | 0–0–1 | | | |
| 1967–68 | **Lancashire Combination**; **Division One** | | 42 | 21 | 10 | 11 | 78 | 60 | +18 | 52 | **5th of 22** | | | | QR1 | 0–0–1 | | | |
| 1967–68 | **Lancashire Combination**; **Division One** | | The league swithed back to a single division. | | | | | | | | | | | | QR1 | 0–0–1 | | | |
| 1968–69 | **Lancashire Combination** | | 42 | 22 | 9 | 11 | 95 | 48 | +47 | 53 | **7th of 22** | | | | QR2 | 1–1–1 | | | |
| 1968–69 | **Lancashire Combination** | | The club moved to the Cheshire County League. | | | | | | | | | | | | QR2 | 1–1–1 | | | |
| 1969–70 | **Cheshire County League** | | 38 | 15 | 8 | 15 | 69 | 68 | +1 | 38 | **10th of 20** | | | | QR1 | 0–0–1 | | | |
| 1970–71 | **Cheshire County League** | | 42 | 16 | 11 | 15 | 66 | 59 | +7 | 43 | **9th of 22** | | | | QR2 | 2–0–1 | | | |
| 1971–72 | **Cheshire County League** | | 42 | 23 | 9 | 10 | 72 | 48 | +24 | 55 | **3rd of 22** | | | | QR1 | 0–0–1 | | | |
| 1972–73 | **Cheshire County League** | | 42 | 27 | 7 | 8 | 73 | 36 | +37 | 61 | **2nd of 22** | | | | QR3 | 2–0–1 | | | Roly Howard |
| 1973–74 | **Cheshire County League** | | 42 | 28 | 8 | 6 | 79 | 26 | +53 | 64 | **1st of 22** | | | | QR2 | 1–3–1 | | | Roly Howard |
| 1974–75 | **Cheshire County League** | | 42 | 24 | 7 | 11 | 73 | 40 | +33 | 55 | **5th of 22** | | | | R1 | 4–2–1 | QR1 | 1–0–1 | Roly Howard |
| 1975–76 | **Cheshire County League** | | 42 | 28 | 8 | 6 | 94 | 34 | +60 | 64 | **1st of 22** | | | | R2 | 5–3–1 | QR3 | 3–1–1 | Roly Howard |
| 1976–77 | **Cheshire County League** | | 42 | 18 | 14 | 10 | 62 | 40 | +22 | 50 | **7th of 22** | | | | QR4 | 0–1–1 | R1 | 0–0–1 | Roly Howard |
| 1977–78 | **Cheshire County League** | | 42 | 26 | 10 | 6 | 101 | 48 | +53 | 62 | **1st of 22** | | | | QR4 | 0–0–1 | R1 | 1–0–1 | Roly Howard |
| 1977–78 | **Cheshire County League** | | The league expanded to two divisions. | | | | | | | | | | | | QR4 | 0–0–1 | R1 | 1–0–1 | Roly Howard |
| 1978–79 | **Cheshire County League**; **Division One** | | 42 | 29 | 5 | 8 | 104 | 38 | +66 | 63 | **3rd of 22** | | | | QR1 | 1–0–1 | R2 | 1–0–1 | Roly Howard |
| 1979–80 | **Northern Premier League** | 6 | 42 | 16 | 10 | 16 | 65 | 57 | +8 | 42 | **10th of 22** | | | | QR4 | 3–1–1 | R3 | 2–1–1 | Roly Howard |
| 1980–81 | **Northern Premier League** | 6 | 42 | 22 | 10 | 10 | 66 | 41 | +25 | 54 | **3rd of 22** | | | | QR4 | 4–1–0 | R2 | 1–0–1 | Roly Howard |
| 1981–82 | **Northern Premier League** | 6 | 42 | 17 | 12 | 13 | 64 | 57 | +7 | 46 | **9th of 22** | | | | QR3 | 3–1–1 | R1 | 0–0–1 | Roly Howard |
| 1982–83 | **Northern Premier League** | 6 | 42 | 17 | 17 | 8 | 81 | 57 | +24 | 68 | **6th of 22** | | | | QR1 | 0–0–1 | R1 | 0–0–1 | Roly Howard |
| 1983–84 | **Northern Premier League** | 6 | 42 | 16 | 10 | 16 | 63 | 68 | −5 | 58 | **12th of 22** | | | | QR2 | 1–0–1 | SF | 5–2–1 | Roly Howard |
| 1984–85 | **Northern Premier League** | 6 | 42 | 18 | 15 | 9 | 59 | 34 | +25 | 69 | **5th of 22** | | | | QR4 | 3–0–1 | R2 | 1–0–1 | Roly Howard |
| 1985–86 | **Northern Premier League** | 6 | 42 | 23 | 11 | 8 | 63 | 35 | +28 | 80 | **2nd of 22** | | | | QR4 | 3–1–1 | R1 | 0–0–1 | Roly Howard |
| 1986–87 | **Northern Premier League** | 6 | 42 | 21 | 10 | 11 | 70 | 43 | +27 | 73 | **4th of 22** | | | | QR1 | 0–0–1 | R2 | 1–0–1 | Roly Howard |
| 1986–87 | **Northern Premier League** | 6 | The league expanded to two divisions. | | | | | | | | | | | | QR1 | 0–0–1 | R2 | 1–0–1 | Roly Howard |
| 1987–88 | **Northern Premier League**; **Premier Division** | 6 | 42 | 19 | 10 | 13 | 67 | 45 | +22 | 67 | **9th of 22** | | | | QR3 | 1–1–1 | R2 | 2–3–1 | Roly Howard |
| 1988–89 | **Northern Premier League**; **Premier Division** | 6 | 42 | 23 | 7 | 12 | 69 | 48 | +21 | 76 | **5th of 22** | | | | QR2 | 1–0–1 | R1 | 0–1–1 | Roly Howard |
| 1989–90 | **Northern Premier League**; **Premier Division** | 6 | 42 | 16 | 14 | 12 | 59 | 55 | +4 | 62 | **9th of 22** | | | | R1 | 4–3–1 | R1 | 1–0–1 | Roly Howard |
| 1990–91 | **Northern Premier League**; **Premier Division** | 6 | 40 | 18 | 11 | 11 | 56 | 39 | +17 | 65 | **6th of 21** | | | | QR4 | 3–3–1 | QR3 | 0–0–1 | Roly Howard |
| 1991–92 | **Northern Premier League**; **Premier Division** | 6 | 42 | 23 | 9 | 10 | 64 | 32 | +32 | 78 | **2nd of 22** | | | | QR2 | 2–1–1 | SF | 7–4–1 | Roly Howard |
| 1992–93 | **Northern Premier League**; **Premier Division** | 6 | 42 | 26 | 8 | 8 | 83 | 47 | +36 | 86 | **4th of 22** | | | | R3 | 6–0–1 | R3 | 2–0–1 | Roly Howard |
| 1993–94 | **Northern Premier League**; **Premier Division** | 6 | 42 | 27 | 9 | 6 | 106 | 62 | +44 | 90 | **1st of 22** | | | | R1 | 1–2–0 | R1 | 0–1–1 | Roly Howard |
| 1993–94 | **Northern Premier League**; **Premier Division** | 6 | Not promoted due to ground grading standarts | | | | | | | | | | | | R1 | 1–2–0 | R1 | 0–1–1 | Roly Howard |
| 1994–95 | **Northern Premier League**; **Premier Division** | 6 | 42 | 29 | 11 | 2 | 83 | 27 | +56 | 98 | **1st of 22** | | | | QR4 | 0–0–1 | QF | 3–0–1 | Roly Howard |
| 1994–95 | **Northern Premier League**; **Premier Division** | 6 | Not promoted due to ground grading standarts | | | | | | | | | | | | QR4 | 0–0–1 | QF | 3–0–1 | Roly Howard |
| 1995–96 | **Northern Premier League**; **Premier Division** | 6 | 42 | 15 | 14 | 13 | 59 | 54 | +5 | 59 | **12th of 22** | | | | R1 | 4–1–1 | R1 | 0–2–1 | Roly Howard |
| 1996–97 | **Northern Premier League**; **Premier Division** | 6 | 44 | 20 | 15 | 9 | 53 | 37 | +16 | 75 | **8th of 23** | | | | QR3 | 2–0–1 | QR3 | 0–0–1 | Roly Howard |
| 1997–98 | **Northern Premier League**; **Premier Division** | 6 | 42 | 15 | 11 | 16 | 56 | 59 | −3 | 56 | **11th of 22** | | | | QR3 | 2–1–1 | QR3 | 0–1–1 | Roly Howard |
| 1998–99 | **Northern Premier League**; **Premier Division** | 6 | 42 | 10 | 17 | 15 | 61 | 69 | −8 | 47 | **17th of 20** | | | | QR3 | 1–1–1 | R1 | 0–0–1 | Roly Howard |
| 1999–2000 | **Northern Premier League**; **Premier Division** | 6 | 44 | 21 | 16 | 7 | 78 | 46 | +32 | 79 | **4th of 23** | | | | QR4 | 2–2–1 | R5 | 3–1–1 | Roly Howard |
| 2000–01 | **Northern Premier League**; **Premier Division** | 6 | 44 | 12 | 13 | 19 | 62 | 78 | −16 | 49 | **18th of 23** | | | 280 | QR3 | 1–0–1 | R4 | 2–0–1 | Roly Howard |
| 2001–02 | **Northern Premier League**; **Premier Division** | 6 | 44 | 11 | 17 | 16 | 62 | 71 | −9 | 50 | **17th of 23** | | | 271 | QR4 | 2–1–1 | R2 | 1–1–1 | Roly Howard |
| 2002–03 | **Northern Premier League**; **Premier Division** | 6 | 44 | 17 | 10 | 17 | 63 | 60 | +3 | 61 | **11th of 23** | | | 336 | QR4 | 2–1–1 | R1 | 0–1–1 | Roly Howard |
| 2003–04 | **Northern Premier League**; **Premier Division** | 6 | 44 | 13 | 12 | 19 | 62 | 74 | −12 | 51 | **16th of 23** | | | 343 | QR3 | 1–0–1 | R4 | 3–1–1 | Roly Howard |
| 2003–04 | **Northern Premier League**; **Premier Division** | 6 | Level of the league decreased after the Conference North and South creation. | | | | | | | | | | | | QR3 | 1–0–1 | R4 | 3–1–1 | Roly Howard |
| 2004–05 | **Northern Premier League**; **Premier Division** | 7 | 42 | 10 | 18 | 14 | 53 | 60 | −7 | 48 | **15th of 22** | | | 284 | QR1 | 0–1–1 | R1 | 0–1–1 | Roly Howard |
| 2005–06 | **Northern Premier League**; **Premier Division** | 7 | 42 | 23 | 12 | 7 | 61 | 25 | +36 | 81 | **3rd of 20** | | | 348 | QR2 | 1–1–1 | QR3 | 2–0–1 | Alvin McDonald |
| 2005–06 | **Northern Premier League**; **Premier Division** | 7 | Lost in the **play-off** semifinal | | | | | | | | | | | | QR2 | 1–1–1 | QR3 | 2–0–1 | Alvin McDonald |
| 2006–07 | **Northern Premier League**; **Premier Division** | 7 | 42 | 22 | 8 | 12 | 70 | 53 | +17 | 74 | **4th of 22** | | | 348 | QR4 | 3–0–1 | QR1 | 0–0–1 | Alvin McDonald |
| 2006–07 | **Northern Premier League**; **Premier Division** | 7 | Lost in the **play-off** semifinal | | | | | | | | | | | | QR4 | 3–0–1 | QR1 | 0–0–1 | Alvin McDonald |
| 2007–08 | **Northern Premier League**; **Premier Division** | 7 | 40 | 19 | 4 | 17 | 70 | 65 | +5 | 61 | **7th of 21** | | | 349 | QR1 | 0–0–1 | QR2 | 1–1–1 | Alvin McDonald |
| 2008–09 | **Northern Premier League**; **Premier Division** | 7 | 42 | 15 | 6 | 21 | 54 | 75 | −21 | 51 | **13th of 22** | | | 356 | QR1 | 0–0–1 | QR2 | 1–0–1 | Alvin McDonald |
| 2009–10 | **Northern Premier League**; **Premier Division** | 7 | 38 | 17 | 6 | 15 | 60 | 55 | +5 | 57 | **9th of 20** | | | 388 | QR1 | 0–0–1 | QR1 | 0–0–1 | Kevin Lynch |
| 2010–11 | **Northern Premier League**; **Premier Division** | 7 | 42 | 20 | 7 | 15 | 74 | 64 | +10 | 67 | **9th of 22** | | | 367 | QR1 | 0–1–1 | QR2 | 1–1–1 | Kevin Lynch |
| 2011–12 | **Northern Premier League**; **Premier Division** | 7 | 42 | 19 | 9 | 14 | 56 | 50 | +6 | 66 | **7th of 22** | | | 432 | QR1 | 0–0–1 | QR3 | 2–0–1 | Kevin Lynch |
| 2012–13 | **Northern Premier League**; **Premier Division** | 7 | 42 | 16 | 11 | 15 | 61 | 61 | 0 | 59 | **11th of 22** | | | 401 | QR4 | 3–0–1 | QR1 | 0–0–1 | Kevin Lynch |
| 2013–14 | **Northern Premier League**; **Premier Division** | 7 | 46 | 13 | 14 | 19 | 68 | 76 | −8 | 53 | **20th of 24** | | | 360 | QR1 | 0–0–1 | QR2 | 1–1–1 | Phil Brazier |
| 2014–15 | **Northern Premier League**; **Premier Division** | 7 | 46 | 11 | 16 | 19 | 58 | 69 | −11 | 49 | **21st of 24** | | | 369 | QR3 | 2–0–1 | QR2 | 1–0–1 | Carl Macauley; Sean Hessey |
| 2015–16 | **Northern Premier League**; **Premier Division** | 7 | 46 | 12 | 17 | 17 | 53 | 61 | −8 | 53 | **15th of 24** | | | 356 | QR3 | 2–1–1 | QR3 | 2–1–1 | Sean Hessey |
| 2016–17 | **Northern Premier League**; **Premier Division** | 7 | 46 | 14 | 13 | 19 | 62 | 74 | −12 | 55 | **18th of 24** | | | 353 | QR2 | 1–1–1 | R1 | 3–2–1 | Sean Hessey; Tommy Lawson |
| 2017–18 | **Northern Premier League**; **Premier Division** | 7 | 46 | 14 | 11 | 21 | 67 | 78 | −11 | 53 | **19th of 24** | | | 365 | QR1 | 0–0–1 | R2 | 4–0–1 | Tommy Lawson |
| 2018–19 | **Northern Premier League**; **Premier Division** | 7 | 40 | 10 | 10 | 20 | 39 | 54 | -15 | 40 | **20th of 21** | | | 415 | QR4 | 3–1–1 | QR1 | 0–0–1 | Tommy Lawson; Neil Young |
| 2019–20 | **Northern Premier League**; **Division One North West** | 8 | 30 | 17 | 7 | 6 | 66 | 34 | +32 | 58 | 3rd of 20 | Niall Cummins | 19 | 446 | QR2 | 2–1–1 | EPR | 0–0–1 | Neil Young |
| 2019–20 | **Northern Premier League**; **Division One North West** | 8 | The season was declared null and void due to COVID-19. | | | | | | | | | | | | QR2 | 2–1–1 | EPR | 0–0–1 | Neil Young |
| 2020–21 | **Northern Premier League**; **Division One North West** | 8 | 7 | 5 | 0 | 2 | 16 | 5 | +11 | 15 | 6th of 19 | | | – (Note: COVID-19 prevented fans from attending games) | R3 | 5–2–1 | R2 | 4–0–1 | Neil Young |
| 2020–21 | **Northern Premier League**; **Division One North West** | 8 | The season was declared null and void due to COVID-19. | | | | | | | | | | | | R3 | 5–2–1 | R2 | 4–0–1 | Neil Young |
| 2021–22 | **Northern Premier League**; **Division One West** | 8 | 38 | 24 | 5 | 9 | 63 | 40 | +23 | 74 (Note: Three points deducted) | **5th of 20** | | | 1124 | QR4 | 4–3–1 | R2 | 0–4–0 | Neil Young |
| 2021–22 | **Northern Premier League**; **Division One West** | 8 | Promoted after winning the **play-off** | | | | | | | | | | | | QR4 | 4–3–1 | R2 | 0–4–0 | Neil Young |
| 2022–23 | **Northern Premier League**; **Premier Division** | 7 | 42 | 17 | 10 | 15 | 56 | 45 | +11 | 61 | **9th of 22** | Sol Solomon | 13 | 1243 | QR2 | 1–0–1 | R2 | 2–1–1 | Neil Young |
| 2023–24 | **Northern Premier League**; **Premier Division** | 7 | 40 | 23 | 7 | 10 | 87 | 44 | +43 | 76 | **3rd of 21** | Finlay Sinclair-Smith | 20 | 1224 | R1 | 4–1–1 | R1 | 1–0–1 | Neil Young |
| 2023–24 | **Northern Premier League**; **Premier Division** | 7 | Promoted after winning the **play-off** | | | | | | | | | | | | R1 | 4–1–1 | R1 | 1–0–1 | Neil Young |
| 2024–25 | **National League North** | 6 | 46 | 16 | 10 | 20 | 45 | 57 | −12 | 58 | **15th of 24** | Finlay Sinclair-Smith | 10 | 1383 | QR2 | 0–0–1 | R2 | 0–0–1 | Neil Young |
| 2025–26 | **National League North** | 6 | 46 | 18 | 8 | 20 | 62 | 72 | −10 | 62 | **12th of 24** | Finlay Sinclair-Smith | 12 | 1247 | QR3 | 1–0–1 | SF | 3–2–1 | Bobby Grant |

== Notes ==
- Marine at the Football Club History Database
