= Frickley Athletic F.C. =

English football club

- Full name: Frickley Athletic Football Club
- Nickname: The Blues
- Founded: 1908; 118 years ago
- Ground: Westfield Lane; South Elmsall
- Capacity: 2,087 (490 seated)
- Chairman: Phil Cooper
- Manager: Lee Morris
- League: Northern Counties East League Premier Division
- 2025–26: Northern Counties East League Premier Division, 15th of 20
- Website: frickleyathletic.co.uk
Home colours	Away colours

Frickley Athletic Football Club is a football club based in South Elmsall, West Yorkshire, England. They are members of the Northern Counties East League Premier Division and play at Westfield Lane.

== History ==
The club was formed on 30 July 1908, and became a member of the South Yorkshire League. The football team was only one arm of the Frickley Athletic Club, which had been formed to give miners at the Frickley Colliery a recreational outlet. In a 1908 Yorkshire Telegraph and Star newspaper article the club was referred to as Frickley Colliery Athletic, but as the years went by the Athletic suffix was used less often.

In 1910, after joining the Sheffield Association League, they entered the FA Cup for the first time, their first game ending in a 0–3 defeat to Rotherham based Atlas Hotel. Frickley returned to the South Yorkshire League for the duration of the First World War, but rejoined the Association League in 1919, and in 1921 they were crowned league champions, pipping Eckington Works to the title. Although they lost the title to Gainsborough Trinity reserves a year later, they did reach the 4th Qualifying Round of the FA Cup for the first time, and in the summer of 1922 they were accepted as new members of the Yorkshire League.

Colliery soon established themselves as one of the league's top sides, finishing in third place in their inaugural campaign in the competition, and going one step further to finish as runners-up a year later. In 1924 they applied to become members of the Midland League, and they were gladly admitted by a competition that had lost a lot of its members the previous year.

The club found the going tough in the Midland League, and for many years struggled against finishing in the lower reaches of the competition – in 1931 they conceded 137 goals and unsurprisingly finished bottom of the league. By 1933, gate receipts had dwindled and they withdrew from league football for a year. They returned in 1934, but were still often found propping up the league table. In 1936–37 they again finished bottom of the pile, but the season had provided a highlight when Frickley reached the 1st round proper of the FA Cup for the first time ever – although they lost 0–2 to Football League side Southport at Westfield Lane, a bumper crowd gave the club coffers a much needed boost.

Frickley returned to play in the Sheffield Association League for the duration of the Second World War, but rejoined the Midland League in 1945. Their second appearance in the FA Cup proper came in the 1957–58 season, when they were knocked out by South Shields away from home.

In 1960 the Midland League disbanded, and Frickley, having finished bottom of the table, opted to join the Cheshire League, a competition they remained in for the duration of the 1960s, despite the Midland League having been restarted only a year after folding. Colliery were far more competitive in the Cheshire League, although they never troubled the top places in the division. In 1963 they beat Macclesfield Town away in the Fourth Qualifying Round of the FA Cup to set up a mouth-watering First round tie at Meadow Lane against Notts County, the Third Division only just progressing after beating Frickley 2–1. In 1969 the club entered the FA Trophy for the first time.

In 1970 Colliery returned to the Midland League, which had lost a lot of its members to the recently formed Northern Premier League. Frickley soon became one of the more accomplished sides in the league, with third and second-placed finishes (in 1971 and 1973 respectively) sandwiching another trip to the first round of the FA Cup. Rotherham United journeyed to Westfield Lane and had to settle for a 2–2 draw in a thrilling encounter before seeing off the non-league side in the replay at Millmoor. Two years later the Blues faced another Yorkshire derby in the FA Cup proper, but the encounter was less memorable for Frickley, who were trounced 1–6 at The Shay.

In 1976, two years after changing their name to Frickley Athletic, the club was admitted to the Northern Premier League. At first they became whipping boys, finishing fourth bottom in the inaugural campaign, but they soon turned the tide, and in 1980 finished in third place. The club committee decided to apply for membership of the recently founded Alliance Premier League (APL), the highest level below the Football League, and were rewarded with a place in the competition for the 1980–81 season.

Any fears that Frickley would find the APL too tough were soon allayed, and the club was to embark on a golden era. The club reached the FA Cup proper in four successive years from 1983, reaching the second round in 1984 (losing to Darlington at Feethams) and going one better a year later. After beating Hartlepool United away in the second round (their first ever win over Football League opposition), Frickley got the home draw they wanted in the third round, with local rivals Rotherham United the visitors to Westfield Lane. The Millers came away with the spoils, winning 3–1 in front of a ground record crowd of 5,800, but Frickley's season would only get better – they would come within a whisker of taking the APL title, with only Enfield able to finish above them in the league table and take the championship.

The APL was renamed the Football Conference for the following season, and Frickley's golden era had come to an end. They finished second bottom of the division and were relegated back to the Northern Premier League (NPL) Premier Division. They remained in the NPL Premier Division from 1987 until 2017, only once looking like winning promotion again in 2006, when they finished as league runners-up but were beaten in the end of season play-offs. On more than one occasion Frickley have finished in the bottom three but have been reprieved from relegation. In 2016-17 the club was relegated to the NPL Division 1 South. The club finished 2017–18 in third place but were defeated in the playoff semi finals to miss out on an immediate return. Then in 2022, the club was relegated to the ninth tier of English football, the Northern Counties East Football League Premier Division, for the first time in the club's history.

Frickley's last appearance in the FA Cup proper was in 2000, when they were beaten 4–0 by Northampton Town at Sixfields Stadium.

=== Season-by-season record ===
Season	Division	Level	Position	FA Cup	FA Trophy	FA Vase	Notes
1908–09	South Yorkshire League	–	9th/11	–	–	–	
1909–10	South Yorkshire League	–	4th/5	–	–	–	
1910–11	Sheffield Association League	–	6th/14	EPR	–	–	
1911–12	Sheffield Association League	–	2nd/16	–	–	–	
1912–13	Sheffield Association League	–	11th/15	PR	–	–	
1913–14	Sheffield Association League	–	16th/16	1QR	–	–	
1914–15	Sheffield Association League	–		1QR	–	–	
1915–16	South Yorkshire League	–		–	–	–	
1916–17	South Yorkshire League	–		–	–	–	
1917–18	South Yorkshire League	–		–	–	–	
1918–19	South Yorkshire League	–		–	–	–	
1919–20	Sheffield Association League	–		2QR	–	–	
1920–21	Sheffield Association League	–	1st/17	PR	–	–	League champions
1921–22	Sheffield Association League	–		4QR	–	–	
1922–23	Yorkshire League	–	3rd/16	2QR	–	–	
1923–24	Yorkshire League	–	2nd/18	3QR	–	–	
1924–25	Midland League	–	13th/15	1QR	–	–	
1925–26	Midland League	–	20th/21	1QR	–	–	
1926–27	Midland League	–	12th/20	2QR	–	–	
1927–28	Midland League	–	18th/23	3QR	–	–	
1928–29	Midland League	–	14th/26	1QR	–	–	
1929–30	Midland League	–	19th/26	PR	–	–	
1930–31	Midland League	–	24th/24	1QR	–	–	
1931–32	Midland League	–	23rd/24	2QR	–	–	
1932–33	Midland League	–	14th/23	2QR	–	–	
1933–34	No league entered	–	–	1QR	–	–	
1934–35	Midland League	–	19th/20	1QR	–	–	
1935–36	Midland League	–	19th/20	1QR	–	–	
1936–37	Midland League	–	22nd/22	1R	–	–	
1937–38	Midland League	–	10th/22	2QR	–	–	
1938–39	Midland League	–	17th/22	4QR	–	–	
1939–40	Club did not enter any competitions due to World War II						
1940–41	Sheffield Association League	–		–	–	–	
1941–42	Sheffield Association League	–		–	–	–	
1942–43	Sheffield Association League	–		–	–	–	
1943–44	Sheffield Association League	–		–	–	–	
1944–45	Sheffield Association League	–		–	–	–	
1945–46	Midland League	–	7th/19	3QR	–	–	
1946–47	Midland League	–	22nd/22	2QR	–	–	
1947–48	Midland League	–	20th/22	1QR	–	–	
1948–49	Midland League	–	22nd/22	3QR	–	–	
1949–50	Midland League	–	18th/24	1QR	–	–	
1950–51	Midland League	–	13th/22	1QR	–	–	
1951–52	Midland League	–	13th/22	4QR	–	–	
1952–53	Midland League	–	21st/24	4QR	–	–	
1953–54	Midland League	–	18th/24	4QR	–	–	
1954–55	Midland League	–	23rd/24	1QR	–	–	
1955–56	Midland League	–	21st/24	3QR	–	–	
1956–57	Midland League	–	12th/24	4QR	–	–	
1957–58	Midland League	–	10th/24	1R	–	–	
1958–59	Midland League	–	10th/19	1QR	–	–	
1959–60	Midland League	–	17th/17	2QR	–	–	
1960–61	Cheshire League	–	3rd/22	4QR	–	–	
1961–62	Cheshire League	–	21st/22	1QR	–	–	
1962–63	Cheshire League	–	11th/22	2QR	–	–	
1963–64	Cheshire League	–	11th/22	1R	–	–	
1964–65	Cheshire League	–	7th/22	3QR	–	–	
1965–66	Cheshire League	–	14th/22	2QR	–	–	
1966–67	Cheshire League	–	8th/22	1QR	–	–	
1967–68	Cheshire League	–	19th/22	2QR	–	–	
1968–69	Cheshire League	–	11th/20	3QR	–	–	
1969–70	Cheshire League	–	14th/20	3QR	1QR	–	
1970–71	Midland League	–	3rd/18	4QR	3QR	–	
1971–72	Midland League	–	9th/18	1R	1QR	–	
1972–73	Midland League	–	2nd/18	PR	1QR	–	
1973–74	Midland League	–	5th/17	1R	3QR	–	
1974–75	Midland League	–	7th/18	1QR	PR	–	
1975–76	Midland League Premier Division	–	8th/18	3QR	PR	–	
1976–77	Northern Premier League	–	20th/23	1QR	1R	–	
1977–78	Northern Premier League	–	12th/24	2QR	2R	–	
1978–79	Northern Premier League	–	19th/23	1QR	3QR	–	
1979–80	Northern Premier League	–	3rd/22	2QR	3QR	–	Promoted
1980–81	Alliance Premier League	–	10th/20	1QR	3QR	–	
1981–82	Alliance Premier League	–	15th/22	3QR	1R	–	
1982–83	Alliance Premier League	–	16th/22	3QR	3QR	–	
1983–84	Alliance Premier League	–	12th/22	1R	3R	–	
1984–85	Alliance Premier League	–	11th/22	2R	QF	–	
1985–86	Alliance Premier League	–	2nd/22	3R	2R	–	
1986–87	Football Conference	–	21st/22	1R	1R	–	Relegated
1987–88	Northern Premier League Premier Division	–	10th/22	4QR	1R	–	
1988–89	Northern Premier League Premier Division	–	9th/22	1R	2R	–	
1989–90	Northern Premier League Premier Division	–	13th/22	2QR	3QR	–	
1990–91	Northern Premier League Premier Division	–	10th/21	4QR	2R	–	
1991–92	Northern Premier League Premier Division	–	14th/22	3QR	1R	–	
1992–93	Northern Premier League Premier Division	–	7th/22	3QR	1R	–	
1993–94	Northern Premier League Premier Division	–	5th/22	1QR	1R	–	
1994–95	Northern Premier League Premier Division	–	19th/22	3QR	3QR	–	
1995–96	Northern Premier League Premier Division	–	19th/22	2QR	2QR	–	
1996–97	Northern Premier League Premier Division	–	18th/23	3QR	3QR	–	
1997–98	Northern Premier League Premier Division	–	16th/22	1QR	1QR	–	
1998–99	Northern Premier League Premier Division	–	16th/22	4QR	3R	–	
1999–00	Northern Premier League Premier Division	–	16th/23	2QR	3R	–	
2000–01	Northern Premier League Premier Division	–	20th/23	1R	1R	–	
2001–02	Northern Premier League Premier Division	–	13th/23	2QR	2R	–	
2002–03	Northern Premier League Premier Division	–	20th/23	2QR	2R	–	
2003–04	Northern Premier League Premier Division	–	22nd/23	2QR	2R	–	
2004–05	Northern Premier League Premier Division	7	18th/22	2QR	1R	–	
2005–06	Northern Premier League Premier Division	7	2nd/22	2QR	1QR	–	
2006–07	Northern Premier League Premier Division	7	16th/22	2QR	1QR	–	
2007–08	Northern Premier League Premier Division	7	14th/21	1QR	2QR	–	
2008–09	Northern Premier League Premier Division	7	11th/22	3QR	1QR	–	
2009–10	Northern Premier League Premier Division	7	15th/20	3QR	2QR	–	
2010–11	Northern Premier League Premier Division	7	18th/22	3QR	1QR	–	
2011–12	Northern Premier League Premier Division	7	19th/22	3QR	1QR	–	
2012–13	Northern Premier League Premier Division	7	18th/22	3QR	1QR	–	
2013–14	Northern Premier League Premier Division	7	21st/24	2QR	1QR	–	
2014–15	Northern Premier League Premier Division	7	19th/24	1QR	1QR	–	
2015–16	Northern Premier League Premier Division	7	7th/24	2QR	1QR	–	
2016–17	Northern Premier League Premier Division	7	22nd/24	1QR	1QR	–	Relegated
2017–18	Northern Premier League Division One South	8	3rd/22	1QR	1QR	–	
2018–19	Northern Premier League Division One East	8	12th/20	2QR	1QR	–	
2019–20	Northern Premier League Division One South East	8	–	PR	EPR	–	League season abandoned due to COVID-19 pandemic
2020–21	Northern Premier League Division One South East	8	–	1QR	3QR	–	League season abandoned due to COVID-19 pandemic
2021–22	Northern Premier League Division One South East	8	18th/19	PR	3QR	–	Relegated
2022–23	Northern Counties East League Premier Division	9	17th/20	EPR	–	1R	
2023–24	Northern Counties East League Premier Division	9	15th/20	EPR	–	1QR	
2024–25	Northern Counties East League Premier Division	9	18th/20	EPR	–	2QR	
2025–26	Northern Counties East League Premier Division	9	15th/20	EPR	–	1QR	
Season	Division	Level	Position	FA Cup	FA Trophy	FA Vase	Notes

== Players ==
=== First team squad ===
As of 15 November 2026

Note: Flags indicate national team as defined under FIFA eligibility rules; some limited exceptions apply. Players may hold more than one non-FIFA nationality.

No.	Pos.	Nation	Player
—	GK	CMR	Harold Edjangue
—	GK	ENG	Owen Evans
—	DF	ENG	Josh Dacre
—	DF	ENG	Harry Gagen
—	DF	ENG	Jake Holdsworth
—	DF	ENG	Sam Kilner
—	DF	ENG	Dempsey Smith
—	DF	ENG	Stephen Williams
—	MF	ENG	Charlie Austerfield
—	MF	ENG	Lewis O'Connor
—	MF	ENG	Charlie Price

No.	Pos.	Nation	Player
—	MF	ENG	Jayden Roberts
—	MF	ENG	Tyler Sheard
—	MF	ENG	Joel Spence
—	FW	ENG	Sam Awty
—	FW	ENG	Sam Cable
—	FW	ENG	Keelan Grist
—	FW	ENG	Harrison Marvin
—	FW	ENG	Charley Parker
—	FW	ENG	Joe Poxon
—	FW	ENG	Lloyd Smith
—	FW	ENG	Henley Walker

== Coaching staff ==
=== First team coach ===
As of 18 September 2026

Role	Name
Manager	(England) Lee Morris
Assistant manager	(England) Rhys Meynell
Coach/Analyst	(England) Nick Leadbeater
Head physio	(England) Bailey Land
Physio	(England) Katie Birkett

== Ground ==
Since 1910 Frickley have played home games at Westfield Lane. The ground was initially used for athletics as early as 1904, with the main stand being approved for construction in 1927 and opened in 1928, with the help of the miners welfare fund. While the colliery was still operating the stadium sat at the foot of a tall spoil tip, which has since been largely lowered in height and landscaped as part of Frickley Country Park.

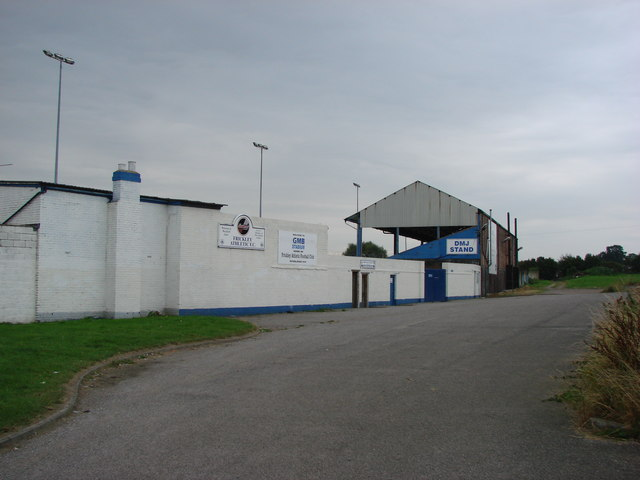

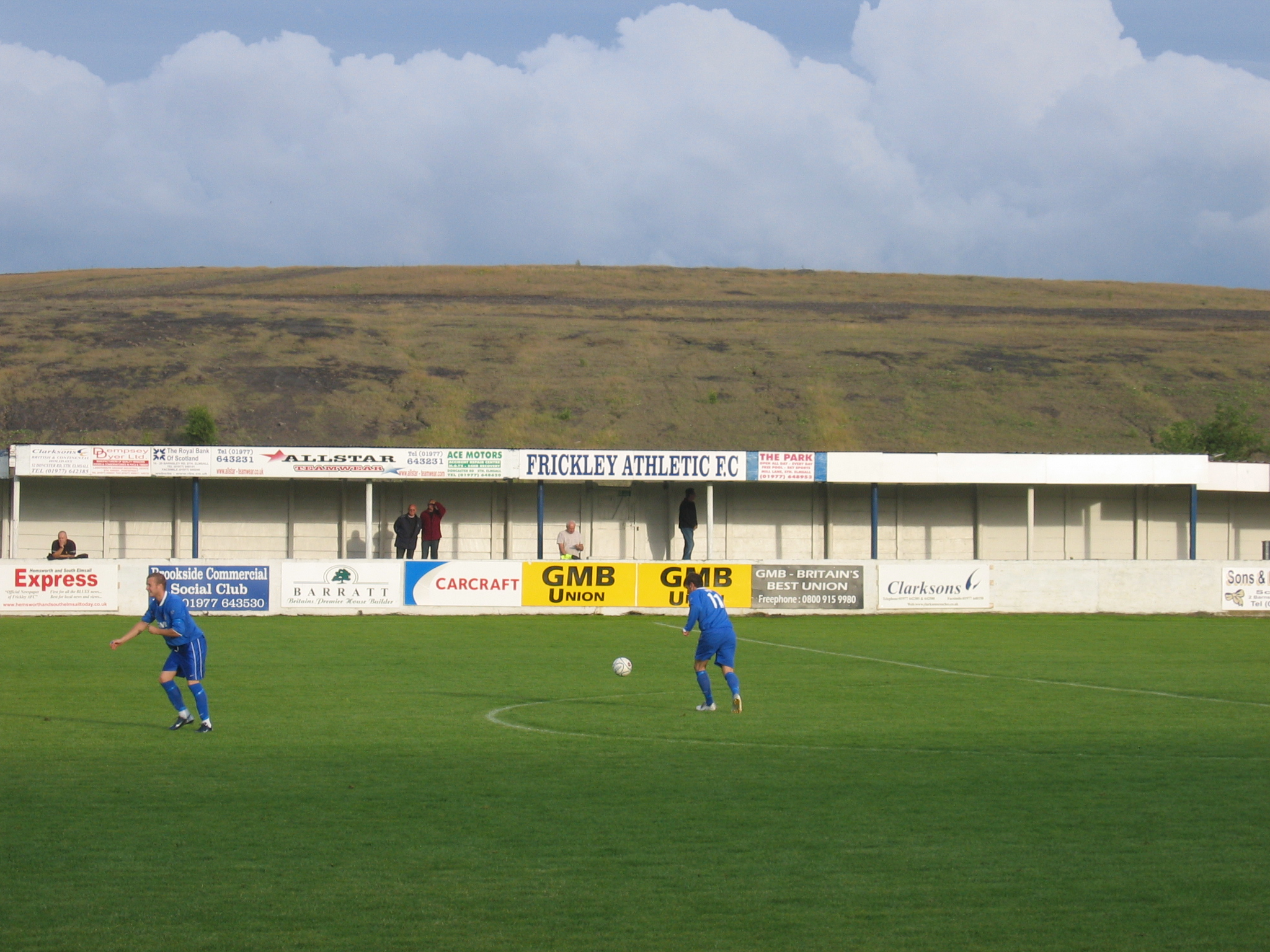

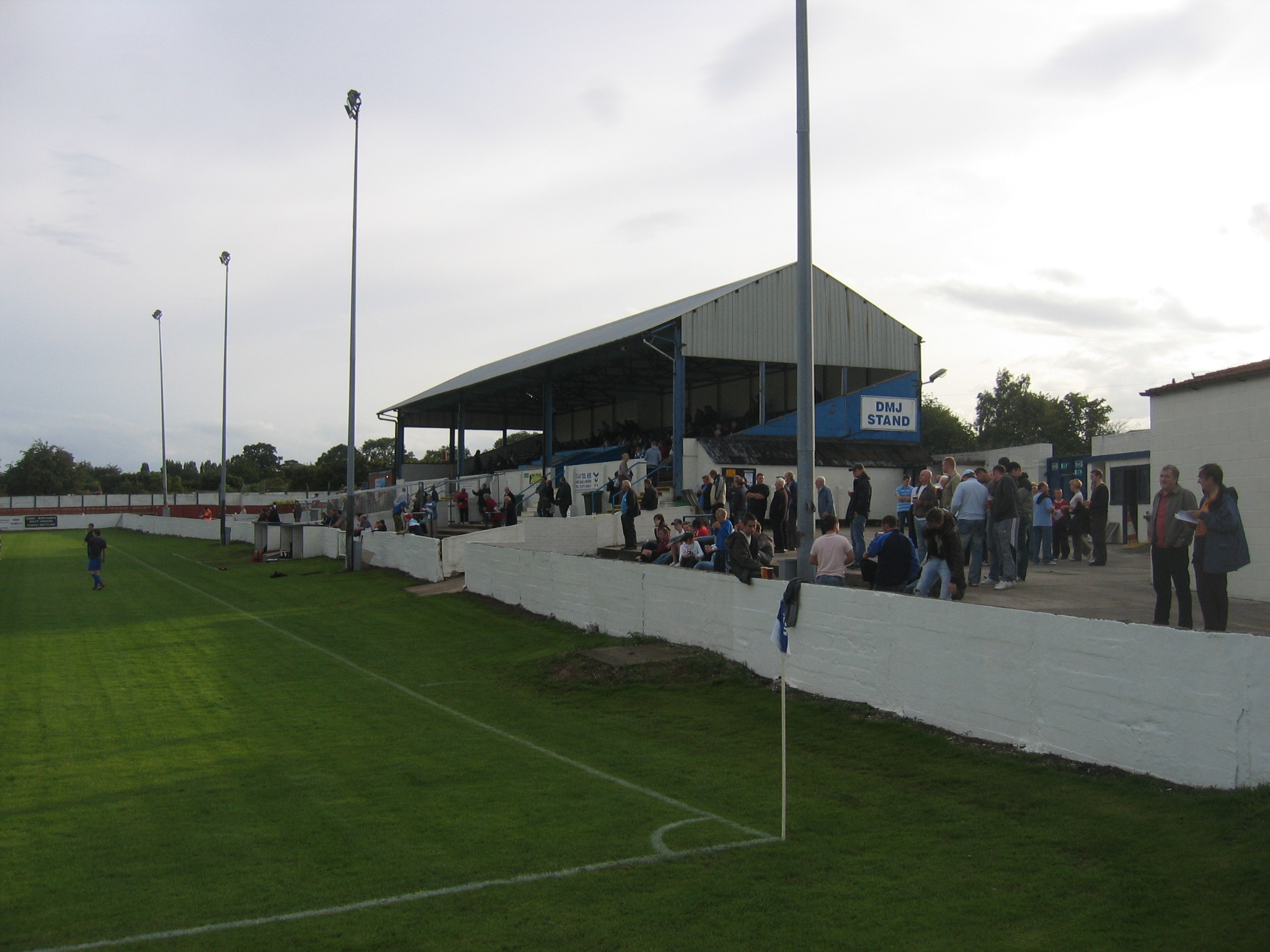

== Honours ==
- Sheffield Association League
  - Champions: 1920/21
- Sheffield and Hallamshire Senior Cup
  - Winners: 1927/28, 1956/57, 1960/61, 1962/63, 1966/67, 1978/79, 1985/86, 1987/88, 1989/90, 1999/00, 2003/04, 2012/13, 2014/15, 2015/16
- Midland League Cup
  - Winners: 1975–76

== Records ==
- Best League performance: 2nd, Alliance Premier League, 1985–86
- Best FA Cup performance: Third round, 1985–86
- Best FA Trophy performance: Quarter-finals, 1984–85
- Record attendance: 5,800 vs. Rotherham United, FA Cup Third round, 1985–86
- Record Transfer Fee Paid: £1000 to Ercall Colts (Telford) for Robert Hussey, 1996

== See also ==
- Frickley Athletic F.C. players
