= 1972–73 FA Cup qualifying rounds =

Tournament details
- Country: England; Wales

The FA Cup 1972–73 is the 92nd season of the world's oldest football knockout competition; The Football Association Challenge Cup, or FA Cup for short. The large number of clubs entering the tournament from lower down the English football league system meant that the competition started with a number of preliminary and qualifying rounds. The 28 victorious teams from the fourth round qualifying progressed to the first round proper.

== Preliminary round ==
=== Ties ===
Tie	Home team	Score	Away team
1	Hertford Town	2–1	Bromley
2	Hitchin Town	3–0	Dunstable Town
3	Lewes	3–0	Eastbourne United
4	Moor Green	2–1	Darlaston
5	Newport I O W	2–0	Cowes
6	Norton Woodseats	0–0	Heanor Town
7	Nuneaton Borough	1–1	Kidderminster Harriers
8	Ormskirk	3–3	Chorley
9	Prestwich Heys	3–3	Horwich R M I
10	Rawmarsh Welfare	0–1	Glossop
11	Ringmer	0–1	Haywards Heath
12	Rushden Town	0–1	Long Eaton United
13	Sheppey United	2–2	Dover
14	Slough Town	1–0	Bedford Town
15	Soham Town Rangers	0–2	Histon
16	Southall	0–1	Dulwich Hamlet
17	Spalding United	0–2	Kettering Town
18	Stonehouse	4–0	Cinderford Town
19	Sutton Coldfield Town	0–0	Highgate United
20	Sutton United	3–1	Corinthian Casuals
21	Thetford Town	2–1	King's Lynn
22	Tilbury	2–1	Ilford
23	Ton Pentre	3–3	Merthyr Tydfil
24	Tonbridge	1–1	Maidstone United
25	Truro City	1–0	Falmouth Town
26	Walton & Hersham	1–1	Metropolitan Police
27	Welton Rovers	2–0	Melksham Town
28	Wembley	1–3	Hayes
29	Whitby Town	0–1	Goole Town
30	Winsford United	3–1	Northwich Victoria
31	Winterton Rangers	2–0	Frickley Colliery

=== Replays ===
Tie	Home team	Score	Away team
6	Heanor Town	2–1	Norton Woodseats
7	Kidderminster Harriers	0–1	Nuneaton Borough
8	Chorley	1–0	Ormskirk
9	Horwich R M I	4–1	Prestwich Heys
13	Dover	1–0	Sheppey United
19	Highgate United	2–0	Sutton Coldfield Town
23	Merthyr Tydfil	1–0	Ton Pentre
24	Maidstone United	1–2	Tonbridge
26	Metropolitan Police	1–6	Walton & Hersham

== 1st qualifying round ==
=== Ties ===
Tie	Home team	Score	Away team
1	Accrington Stanley	1–1	Darwen
2	Addlestone	1–0	Croydon
3	Alton Town	2–0	Farnborough Town
4	Alvechurch	3–1	Oldbury United
5	Aylesbury United	1–1	Oxford City
6	Bacup Borough	1–0	Morecambe
7	Banbury United	4–1	Wokingham Town
8	Barking	1–0	Rainham Town
9	Barnstaple Town	3–1	Bodmin Town
10	Basingstoke Town	1–1	Winchester City
11	Bath City	0–0	Cheltenham Town
12	Bedworth United	0–3	Rugby Town
13	Belper Town	1–1	Alfreton Town
14	Bexley United	1–0	Bracknell Town
15	Bideford	3–2	Penzance
16	Billingham Synthonia	3–2	Stanley United
17	Bishop's Stortford	1–0	Epping Town
18	Blaenau Ffestiniog	1–2	Oswestry Town
19	Bognor Regis Town	3–0	Dorking
20	Bridgwater Town	3–0	Ferndale Athletic
21	Bridlington Trinity	2–1	Ashby Institute
22	Brierley Hill Alliance	2–1	Tamworth
23	Brigg Town	1–3	Barton Town
24	Burgess Hill Town	1–3	Peacehaven & Telscombe
25	Burscough	2–0	Wigan Rovers
26	Burton Albion	1–0	Atherstone Town
27	Buxton	0–0	Altrincham
28	Carshalton Athletic	0–0	Molesey
29	Chatham Town	0–2	Ashford Town (Kent)
30	Chesham United	0–1	Witney Town
31	Cheshunt	0–4	Wimbledon
32	Chichester City	0–0	Pagham
33	Chippenham Town	0–4	Devizes Town
34	Chorley	2–1	Formby
35	Clacton Town	1–4	Bury Town
36	Clapton	1–2	Aveley
37	Consett	3–1	Ryhope Colliery Welfare
38	Corby Town	3–1	Boston
39	Cray Wanderers	2–1	Canterbury City
40	Crook Town	2–0	Ashington
41	Denaby United	1–1	Hatfield Main
42	Desborough Town	1–2	Enderby Town
43	Dorchester Town	1–1	Andover
44	Dover	2–1	Hastings United
45	Droylsden	1–2	Ashton United
46	Dulwich Hamlet	1–2	Hampton
47	Durham City	1–2	Ferryhill Athletic
48	Eastbourne Town	0–5	Arundel
49	Eastwood Hanley	2–1	Congleton Town
50	Eastwood Town	3–3	Arnold
51	Ellesmere Port Town	2–1	Leek Town
52	Emley	1–2	Macclesfield Town
53	Evenwood Town	2–0	Annfield Plain
54	Farsley Celtic	3–2	Bridlington Town
55	Faversham Town	0–2	Bexhill Town
56	Finchley	2–0	Leyton
57	Folkestone	4–1	Deal Town
58	Frome Town	4–2	Bridport
59	Gateshead	1–0	West Auckland Town
60	Glossop	3–2	Mexborough Town
61	Gloucester City	2–2	Trowbridge Town
62	Goole Town	0–0	Scarborough
63	Gorleston	0–2	Chatteris Town
64	Gosport Borough	2–0	Ryde Sports
65	Gravesend & Northfleet	1–1	St Albans City
66	Great Harwood	4–1	Clitheroe
67	Great Yarmouth Town	2–2	Ely City
68	Gresley Rovers	0–1	Warley
69	Halesowen Town	1–4	Bilston
70	Harlow Town	1–0	Uxbridge
71	Harrow Borough	0–0	Erith & Belvedere
72	Harwich & Parkeston	1–3	Cambridge City
73	Hatfield Town	1–4	Biggleswade & District
74	Hayes	4–1	Hoddesdon Town
75	Haywards Heath	2–2	Littlehampton Town
76	Heanor Town	0–0	Ilkeston Town
77	Hednesford Town	1–5	Bromsgrove Rovers
78	Hemel Hempstead	2–9	Dartford
79	Herne Bay	5–0	Tunbridge Wells
80	Hertford Town	2–0	Ford United
81	Highgate United	6–0	Gornal Athletic
82	Histon	1–3	Potton United
83	Hitchin Town	2–1	Fleet Town
84	Holbeach United	0–1	Bourne Town
85	Horden Colliery Welfare	0–2	North Shields
86	Hornchurch	0–8	Walthamstow Avenue
87	Horwich R M I	3–3	Hyde United
88	Irthlingborough Diamonds	1–1	Hinckley Athletic
89	Kettering Town	4–0	Louth United
90	Lancaster City	3–1	Fleetwood
91	Leatherhead	3–0	Worthing
92	Letchworth Town	1–2	Egham Town
93	Lewes	1–0	Horsham
94	Leytonstone	1–0	Hounslow
95	Llanelli	0–1	Barry Town
96	Long Eaton United	3–0	Loughborough United
97	Lye Town	1–0	Redditch United
98	Maidenhead United	0–1	Woking
99	March Town United	1–1	Wisbech Town
100	Matlock Town	1–1	Sutton Town
101	Merthyr Tydfil	1–0	Minehead
102	Moor Green	2–1	Dudley Town
103	Mossley	1–1	Stalybridge Celtic
104	Nantwich Town	3–2	Connah's Quay Nomads
105	Netherfield	3–0	Penrith
106	New Brighton	1–4	Marine
107	New Mills	1–3	Radcliffe Borough
108	Newport I O W	2–6	Fareham Town
109	Nuneaton Borough	4–1	Lockheed Leamington
110	Porthmadog	0–0	South Liverpool
111	Redhill	1–0	Southwick
112	Retford Town	1–2	Worksop Town
113	Rothwell Town	1–5	Wellingborough Town
114	Runcorn	8–0	Leyland Motors
115	Salisbury	9–1	Westbury United
116	Sandbach Ramblers	0–7	Witton Albion
117	Selby Town	0–2	Yorkshire Amateur
118	Shildon	3–4	Murton Colliery Welfare
119	Sittingbourne	2–0	Whitstable Town
120	Skegness Town	3–1	Stamford
121	Slough Town	0–0	Bletchley Town
122	Spennymoor United	5–1	Stockton
123	St Blazey	1–2	Wadebridge Town
124	St Neots Town	1–1	Sudbury Town
125	Stevenage Athletic	1–0	Ware
126	Stocksbridge Works	1–3	Bradford Park Avenue
127	Stonehouse	0–1	Glastonbury
128	Stourbridge	2–1	Worcester City
129	Sutton United	5–1	Marlow
130	Taunton Town	3–1	Weston Super Mare
131	Thetford Town	4–2	Lowestoft Town
132	Tilbury	0–0	Kingstonian
133	Tonbridge	1–1	Ramsgate Athletic
134	Tooting & Mitcham United	1–3	Wycombe Wanderers
135	Tow Law Town	1–1	Boldon Colliery Welfare
136	Truro City	2–1	Newquay
137	Vauxhall Motors	0–0	Edmonton
138	Walton & Hersham	3–0	Staines Town
139	Wealdstone	0–0	Windsor & Eton
140	Welton Rovers	2–0	Poole Town
141	Whitley Bay	0–1	Bishop Auckland
142	Wingate (Durham)	1–4	Willington
143	Winsford United	1–0	Prescot Town
144	Winterton Rangers	1–3	Gainsborough Trinity

=== Replays ===
Tie	Home team	Score	Away team
1	Darwen	2–4	Accrington Stanley
5	Oxford City	3–0	Aylesbury United
10	Winchester City	1–1	Basingstoke Town
11	Cheltenham Town	3–2	Bath City
13	Alfreton Town	4–1	Belper Town
27	Altrincham	4–1	Buxton
28	Molesey	4–1	Carshalton Athletic
32	Pagham	1–2	Chichester City
41	Hatfield Main	0–0	Denaby United
43	Andover	2–1	Dorchester Town
50	Arnold	0–5	Eastwood Town
61	Trowbridge Town	2–0	Gloucester City
62	Scarborough	1–0	Goole Town
65	St Albans City	1–0	Gravesend & Northfleet
67	Ely City	3–1	Great Yarmouth Town
71	Erith & Belvedere	2–1	Harrow Borough
75	Littlehampton Town	1–2	Haywards Heath
76	Ilkeston Town	0–2	Heanor Town
87	Hyde United	1–0	Horwich R M I
88	Hinckley Athletic	1–2	Irthlingborough Diamonds
99	Wisbech Town	3–0	March Town United
100	Sutton Town	3–2	Matlock Town
103	Stalybridge Celtic	4–3	Mossley
110	South Liverpool	2–1	Porthmadog
121	Bletchley Town	0–3	Slough Town
124	Sudbury Town	6–1	St Neots Town
132	Kingstonian	1–2	Tilbury
133	Ramsgate Athletic	0–3	Tonbridge
135	Boldon Colliery Welfare	0–3	Tow Law Town
137	Edmonton	0–2	Vauxhall Motors
139	Windsor & Eton	0–3	Wealdstone

=== 2nd replay ===
Tie	Home team	Score	Away team
10	Basingstoke Town	0–0	Winchester City
41	Denaby United	1–2	Hatfield Main

=== 3rd replay ===
Tie	Home team	Score	Away team
10	Winchester City	0–3	Basingstoke Town

== 2nd qualifying round ==
=== Ties ===
Tie	Home team	Score	Away team
1	Accrington Stanley	1–1	Runcorn
2	Addlestone	0–1	St Albans City
3	Alfreton Town	3–0	Sutton Town
4	Alton Town	8–1	Gosport Borough
5	Altrincham	3–2	Radcliffe Borough
6	Alvechurch	4–0	Lye Town
7	Andover	0–1	Salisbury
8	Arundel	1–2	Haywards Heath
9	Ashford Town (Kent)	6–0	Herne Bay
10	Ashton United	1–1	Hyde United
11	Aveley	1–2	Sutton United
12	Banbury United	2–1	Slough Town
13	Barking	1–0	Hertford Town
14	Barnstaple Town	3–0	Wadebridge Town
15	Barry Town	1–0	Merthyr Tydfil
16	Barton Town	2–2	Gainsborough Trinity
17	Basingstoke Town	3–1	Fareham Town
18	Bexhill Town	0–0	Sittingbourne
19	Bexley United	1–0	Walthamstow Avenue
20	Bideford	8–0	Truro City
21	Biggleswade & District	0–2	Woking
22	Bilston	3–2	Stourbridge
23	Bishop's Stortford	4–1	Hitchin Town
24	Bognor Regis Town	2–0	Leatherhead
25	Bourne Town	1–5	Kettering Town
26	Bradford Park Avenue	2–1	Stalybridge Celtic
27	Bridgwater Town	0–4	Taunton Town
28	Bridlington Trinity	0–1	Worksop Town
29	Brierley Hill Alliance	5–2	Warley
30	Bromsgrove Rovers	2–1	Highgate United
31	Burscough	1–1	Chorley
32	Burton Albion	2–1	Moor Green
33	Bury Town	1–1	Sudbury Town
34	Cambridge City	3–1	Potton United
35	Chatteris Town	3–1	Wisbech Town
36	Cheltenham Town	4–0	Trowbridge Town
37	Chichester City	1–2	Redhill
38	Consett	1–2	Willington
39	Corby Town	0–2	Skegness Town
40	Cray Wanderers	0–2	Dover
41	Crook Town	4–2	Tow Law Town
42	Dartford	4–3	Tilbury
43	Devizes Town	7–2	Glastonbury
44	Eastwood Hanley	3–0	Witton Albion
45	Eastwood Town	2–0	Heanor Town
46	Egham Town	2–6	Wycombe Wanderers
47	Ellesmere Port Town	1–0	Winsford United
48	Ely City	2–0	Thetford Town
49	Enderby Town	2–1	Wellingborough Town
50	Erith & Belvedere	1–2	Hayes
51	Evenwood Town	0–0	Billingham Synthonia
52	Farsley Celtic	0–1	Scarborough
53	Ferryhill Athletic	3–2	Bishop Auckland
54	Finchley	0–2	Wealdstone
55	Folkestone	0–1	Tonbridge
56	Frome Town	1–1	Welton Rovers
57	Great Harwood	5–0	Netherfield
58	Hatfield Main	1–2	Yorkshire Amateur
59	Irthlingborough Diamonds	2–1	Long Eaton United
60	Lancaster City	2–1	Bacup Borough
61	Leytonstone	2–2	Walton & Hersham
62	Macclesfield Town	3–0	Glossop
63	Marine	3–1	Oswestry Town
64	Molesey	0–0	Hampton
65	Murton Colliery Welfare	2–4	Gateshead
66	Nantwich Town	1–1	South Liverpool
67	Oxford City	0–4	Witney Town
68	Peacehaven & Telscombe	0–1	Lewes
69	Rugby Town	0–1	Nuneaton Borough
70	Spennymoor United	1–1	North Shields
71	Vauxhall Motors	2–1	Harlow Town
72	Wimbledon	3–1	Stevenage Athletic

=== Replays ===
Tie	Home team	Score	Away team
1	Runcorn	2–1	Accrington Stanley
10	Hyde United	2–2	Ashton United
16	Gainsborough Trinity	3–1	Barton Town
18	Sittingbourne	1–0	Bexhill Town
31	Chorley	1–2	Burscough
33	Sudbury Town	1–3	Bury Town
51	Billingham Synthonia	2–1	Evenwood Town
56	Welton Rovers	0–1	Frome Town
61	Walton & Hersham	3–0	Leytonstone
64	Hampton	1–0	Molesey
66	South Liverpool	1–0	Nantwich Town
70	North Shields	2–2	Spennymoor United

=== 2nd replays ===
Tie	Home team	Score	Away team
10	Ashton United	2–1	Hyde United
70	Spennymoor United	1–0	North Shields

== 3rd qualifying round ==
=== Ties ===
Tie	Home team	Score	Away team
1	Ashton United	1–3	Altrincham
2	Banbury United	0–0	Witney Town
3	Barking	3–2	St Albans City
4	Barry Town	0–0	Taunton Town
5	Basingstoke Town	0–2	Alton Town
6	Bideford	1–2	Barnstaple Town
7	Bishop's Stortford	2–0	Vauxhall Motors
8	Bromsgrove Rovers	1–1	Bilston
9	Burscough	2–2	Runcorn
10	Burton Albion	0–1	Brierley Hill Alliance
11	Cambridge City	0–1	Bury Town
12	Crook Town	0–3	Billingham Synthonia
13	Dartford	3–2	Woking
14	Devizes Town	1–0	Cheltenham Town
15	Dover	1–2	Ashford Town (Kent)
16	Eastwood Town	0–4	Alfreton Town
17	Ellesmere Port Town	2–2	Eastwood Hanley
18	Ely City	3–3	Chatteris Town
19	Ferryhill Athletic	1–5	Willington
20	Frome Town	0–0	Salisbury
21	Gainsborough Trinity	1–0	Worksop Town
22	Gateshead	0–4	Spennymoor United
23	Hampton	0–0	Bexley United
24	Hayes	3–1	Wealdstone
25	Haywards Heath	1–2	Redhill
26	Irthlingborough Diamonds	0–4	Enderby Town
27	Kettering Town	7–0	Skegness Town
28	Lancaster City	1–0	Great Harwood
29	Lewes	1–1	Bognor Regis Town
30	Macclesfield Town	1–0	Bradford Park Avenue
31	Marine	0–2	South Liverpool
32	Nuneaton Borough	2–0	Alvechurch
33	Scarborough	2–2	Yorkshire Amateur
34	Sutton United	3–1	Wimbledon
35	Tonbridge	4–1	Sittingbourne
36	Walton & Hersham	1–0	Wycombe Wanderers

=== Replays ===
Tie	Home team	Score	Away team
2	Witney Town	1–2	Banbury United
4	Taunton Town	2–0	Barry Town
8	Bilston	1–0	Bromsgrove Rovers
9	Runcorn	2–3	Burscough
17	Ellesmere Port Town	2–0	Eastwood Hanley
18	Chatteris Town	2–4	Ely City
20	Salisbury	0–1	Frome Town
23	Bexley United	4–1	Hampton
29	Bognor Regis Town	3–1	Lewes
33	Yorkshire Amateur	0–2	Scarborough

== 4th qualifying round ==
The teams that given byes to this round are Telford United, Hillingdon Borough, Skelmersdale United, Dagenham, Barrow, Yeovil Town, South Shields, Chelmsford City, Weymouth, Grantham, Margate, Bangor City, Wigan Athletic, Boston United, Rhyl, Romford, Guildford City, Blyth Spartans, Rossendale United and Crawley Town.

=== Ties ===
Tie	Home team	Score	Away team
1	Alfreton Town	0–2	Nuneaton Borough
2	Alton Town	2–0	Devizes Town
3	Altrincham	1–1	Ellesmere Port Town
4	Ashford Town (Kent)	3–4	Guildford City
5	Barking	1–2	Hayes
6	Barnstaple Town	1–0	Weymouth
7	Billingham Synthonia	1–1	South Shields
8	Bilston	3–0	Brierley Hill Alliance
9	Bishop's Stortford	1–1	Dagenham
10	Bognor Regis Town	1–0	Bexley United
11	Burscough	1–3	Wigan Athletic
12	Bury Town	1–3	Boston United
13	Crawley Town	0–2	Chelmsford City
14	Ely City	1–2	Kettering Town
15	Enderby Town	0–2	Telford United
16	Frome Town	1–1	Banbury United
17	Gainsborough Trinity	1–2	Grantham
18	Hillingdon Borough	0–0	Redhill
19	Lancaster City	3–1	Barrow
20	Macclesfield Town	0–1	South Liverpool
21	Margate	2–0	Sutton United
22	Rossendale United	1–2	Bangor City
23	Scarborough	2–1	Blyth Spartans
24	Skelmersdale United	0–4	Rhyl
25	Tonbridge	0–0	Romford
26	Walton & Hersham	2–2	Dartford
27	Willington	0–2	Spennymoor United
28	Yeovil Town	4–1	Taunton Town

=== Replays ===
Tie	Home team	Score	Away team
3	Ellesmere Port Town	1–2	Altrincham
7	South Shields	2–1	Billingham Synthonia
9	Dagenham	0–4	Bishop's Stortford
16	Banbury United	3–0	Frome Town
18	Redhill	0–1	Hillingdon Borough
25	Romford	1–2	Tonbridge
26	Dartford	0–1	Walton & Hersham

== 1972–73 FA Cup ==
See 1972-73 FA Cup for details of the rounds from the first round proper onwards.
