= 1966–67 FA Cup qualifying rounds =

Tournament details
- Country: England; Wales

The FA Cup 1966–67 is the 86th season of the world's oldest football knockout competition; The Football Association Challenge Cup, or FA Cup for short. The large number of clubs entering the tournament from lower down the English football league system meant that the competition started with a number of preliminary and qualifying rounds. The 30 victorious teams from the fourth round qualifying progressed to the first round proper.

== 1st qualifying round ==
=== Ties ===
Tie	Home team	Score	Away team
1	Annfield Plain	2–2	Ferryhill Athletic
2	Ashington	2–2	North Shields
3	Atherstone Town	1–6	Nuneaton Borough
4	Barry Town	0–1	Merthyr Tydfil
5	Basingstoke Town	1–2	Woking
6	Belper Town	4–2	Gresley Rovers
7	Bexley United	5–1	Woodford Town
8	Billingham Synthonia	1–0	Evenwood Town
9	Bishop's Stortford	2–0	Soham Town Rangers
10	Blyth Spartans	4–1	Whitley Bay
11	Borough United	2–3	Oswestry Town
12	Boston United	4–0	Stamford
13	Bridgwater Town	0–1	Barnstaple Town
14	Bridlington Town	4–0	Selby Town
15	Brierley Hill Alliance	2–1	Wellington Town
16	Bromley	0–1	Tunbridge Wells Rangers
17	Burscough	2–3	Rossendale United
18	Burton Albion	2–0	Arnold
19	Buxton	1–2	Worksop Town
20	Cambridge City	5–3	Letchworth Town
21	Cambridge United	6–0	Biggleswade & District
22	Carshalton Athletic	2–4	Ware
23	Chertsey Town	1–3	Walthamstow Avenue
24	Chesham United	1–0	Wembley
25	Chichester City	2–2	Waterlooville
26	Chippenham Town	4–2	Westbury United
27	Chorley	1–0	Horwich R M I
28	Cinderford Town	2–0	Llanelli
29	Clapton	3–2	Walton & Hersham
30	Consett	2–3	Whitby Town
31	Crawley Town	4–0	Worthing
32	Crittall Athletic	1–0	Tilbury
33	Croydon Amateurs	1–2	Hornchurch
34	Darwen	2–3	Bacup Borough
35	Deal Town	1–1	Sittingbourne
36	Desborough Town	2–1	Wellingborough Town
37	Dorchester Town	5–0	Warminster Town
38	Dorking	0–3	Horsham
39	Dulwich Hamlet	2–1	Redhill
40	Eastbourne United	2–0	Lancing
41	Egham Town	2–2	Wolverton Town & B R
42	Ellesmere Port Town	0–0	Witton Albion
43	Enfield	7–0	Leyton
44	Eynesbury Rovers	0–0	Rushden Town
45	Falmouth Town	0–3	Bideford
46	Fareham Town	5–1	Newport I O W
47	Farsley Celtic	1–0	Yorkshire Amateur
48	Finchley	4–1	Marlow
49	Fleet Town	6–1	Alton Town
50	Fleetwood	3–1	Penrith
51	Ford United	0–1	Cheshunt
52	Gainsborough Trinity	3–0	Ossett Albion
53	Glastonbury	2–2	Portland United
54	Gloucester City	4–1	Abergavenny Thursdays
55	Goole Town	3–1	Hull Brunswick
56	Gorleston	1–3	Sudbury Town
57	Grays Athletic	0–0	Maidenhead United
58	Great Yarmouth Town	0–3	Haverhill Rovers
59	Halesowen Town	2–3	Lower Gornal Athletic
60	Hampton	0–2	Metropolitan Police
61	Harlow Town	0–0	Cray Wanderers
62	Harrogate Town	0–4	Barton Town
63	Harwich & Parkeston	4–2	Clacton Town
64	Hastings United	1–0	Tonbridge
65	Hayes	4–1	Amersham Town
66	Haywards Heath	0–1	Bexhill Town
67	Hednesford	4–4	Bilston
68	Hemel Hempstead	1–0	Huntley & Palmers
69	Herne Bay	0–4	Canterbury City
70	Hertford Town	2–1	Epsom & Ewell
71	Hillingdon Borough	6–0	Aylesbury United
72	Hinckley Athletic	0–4	Worcester City
73	Hitchin Town	1–4	Banbury United
74	Hoddesdon Town	0–7	Bletchley Town
75	Hounslow	2–0	St Albans City
76	Ilford	0–2	Barnet
77	King's Lynn	4–3	Skegness Town
78	Kingstonian	5–2	Aveley
79	Kirkby Town	2–0	Marine
80	Lancaster City	1–1	Clitheroe
81	Leatherhead	1–0	Barking
82	Leytonstone	2–2	Ashford Town (Kent)
83	Littlehampton Town	3–3	Bognor Regis Town
84	Llandudno	0–1	Bangor City
85	Long Eaton United	2–4	Matlock Town
86	Lostock Gralam	3–2	Winsford United
87	Loughborough United	2–2	Bedworth Town
88	Louth United	0–3	Boston
89	Lovells Athletic	0–3	Cheltenham Town
90	Lowestoft Town	6–0	Gothic
91	Lytham	0–1	Nelson
92	Macclesfield Town	2–1	Alfreton Town
93	Maidstone United	2–2	Eastbourne
94	Malden Town	1–0	Feltham
95	March Town United	4–3	Chatteris Town
96	Margate	2–1	Chatham Town
97	Melksham Town	0–4	Trowbridge Town
98	Mexborough Town	0–2	Denaby United
99	Morecambe	7–0	Milnthorpe Corinthians
100	Mossley	6–2	Prescot Town
101	Murton Colliery Welfare	4–2	Durham City
102	Netherfield	4–1	Leyland Motors
103	New Brighton	3–1	Colwyn Bay United
104	Newbury Town	0–3	Andover
105	Newmarket Town	1–1	Bury Town
106	Northwich Victoria	5–0	Congleton Town
107	Oxford City	8–0	Addlestone
108	Poole Town	7–0	Bridport
109	Ramsgate Athletic	2–1	Dover
110	Redditch	0–2	Stratford Town Amateurs
111	Retford Town	4–0	Frickley Colliery
112	Rhyl	5–1	St Helens Town
113	Rugby Town	4–2	Bromsgrove Rovers
114	Ruislip Manor	1–2	Rainham Town
115	Runcorn	5–2	Linotype & Machinery
116	Salisbury	4–1	Cowes
117	Scarborough	1–2	Bridlington Trinity
118	Skelmersdale United	4–3	Nantwich
119	Slough Town	2–0	Dagenham
120	South Bank	4–3	Shildon
121	Southall	3–0	Dunstable Town
122	Spalding United	5–2	Holbeach United
123	Spennymoor United	0–2	Horden Colliery Welfare
124	St Blazey	0–2	St Austell
125	St Neots Town	4–2	Ely City
126	Stalybridge Celtic	2–2	Hyde United
127	Stanley United	1–0	Ryhope Colliery Welfare
128	Stevenage Town	0–0	Erith & Belvedere
129	Stockton	2–2	Boldon Colliery Welfare
130	Stonehouse	3–2	Weston Super Mare
131	Stourbridge	5–3	Dudley Town
132	Street	1–1	Frome Town
133	Sutton Town	1–0	Ilkeston Town
134	Sutton United	4–0	Hatfield Town
135	Tamworth	4–2	Lockheed Leamington
136	Taunton	1–4	Minehead
137	Tooting & Mitcham United	2–3	Brentwood Town
138	Tow Law Town	5–0	West Auckland Town
139	Uxbridge	1–2	Edgware Town
140	Vauxhall Motors	1–2	Corinthian Casuals
141	Welton Rovers	2–0	Devizes Town
142	Willington	0–3	Bishop Auckland
143	Wokingham Town	1–3	Harrow Borough

=== Replays ===
Tie	Home team	Score	Away team
1	Ferryhill Athletic	2–2	Annfield Plain
2	North Shields	2–4	Ashington
25	Waterlooville	4–1	Chichester City
35	Sittingbourne	6–2	Deal Town
41	Wolverton Town & B R	6–1	Egham Town
42	Witton Albion	3–1	Ellesmere Port Town
44	Rushden Town	6–3	Eynesbury Rovers
53	Portland United	4–2	Glastonbury
57	Maidenhead United	3–1	Grays Athletic
61	Cray Wanderers	3–1	Harlow Town
67	Bilston	2–3	Hednesford
80	Clitheroe	0–1	Lancaster City
82	Ashford Town (Kent)	4–0	Leytonstone
83	Bognor Regis Town	1–4	Littlehampton Town
87	Bedworth Town	1–2	Loughborough United
93	Eastbourne	1–3	Maidstone United
105	Bury Town	2–1	Newmarket Town
126	Hyde United	3–1	Stalybridge Celtic
128	Erith & Belvedere	0–3	Stevenage Town
129	Boldon Colliery Welfare	0–0	Stockton
132	Frome Town	1–3	Street

=== 2nd replay ===
Tie	Home team	Score	Away team
1	Annfield Plain	3–2	Ferryhill Athletic
129	Stockton	4–1	Boldon Colliery Welfare

== 2nd qualifying round ==
=== Ties ===
Tie	Home team	Score	Away team
1	Annfield Plain	4–0	Murton Colliery Welfare
2	Barnstaple Town	1–2	Minehead
3	Belper Town	1–3	Burton Albion
4	Bexley United	3–2	Brentwood Town
5	Bideford	5–0	St Austell
6	Bishop Auckland	3–1	South Bank
7	Bishop's Stortford	2–5	Bury Town
8	Blyth Spartans	3–3	Tow Law Town
9	Boston United	2–0	Spalding United
10	Bridlington Town	0–2	Bridlington Trinity
11	Brierley Hill Alliance	5–0	Stourbridge
12	Cambridge City	1–0	Cambridge United
13	Chesham United	4–3	Southall
14	Cheshunt	5–2	Rainham Town
15	Chippenham Town	0–4	Welton Rovers
16	Chorley	2–0	Bacup Borough
17	Cinderford Town	2–2	Gloucester City
18	Clapton	0–2	Slough Town
19	Crawley Town	1–0	Maidstone United
20	Cray Wanderers	1–4	Barnet
21	Crittall Athletic	1–2	Sutton United
22	Desborough Town	1–2	St Neots Town
23	Dorchester Town	2–0	Street
24	Dulwich Hamlet	1–4	Ashford Town (Kent)
25	Eastbourne United	3–2	Bexhill Town
26	Enfield	3–0	Hillingdon Borough
27	Fareham Town	1–0	Andover
28	Farsley Celtic	2–0	Retford Town
29	Finchley	0–0	Bletchley Town
30	Fleetwood	2–2	Netherfield
31	Gainsborough Trinity	2–1	Denaby United
32	Goole Town	3–3	Barton Town
33	Hastings United	2–0	Canterbury City
34	Haverhill Rovers	2–0	Harwich & Parkeston
35	Hemel Hempstead	6–3	Banbury United
36	Horden Colliery Welfare	2–1	Ashington
37	Hornchurch	1–0	Hayes
38	Horsham	3–0	Fleet Town
39	Hounslow	0–3	Oxford City
40	King's Lynn	2–1	Boston
41	Kirkby Town	0–1	Bangor City
42	Lostock Gralam	1–1	Skelmersdale United
43	Lower Gornal Athletic	0–3	Hednesford
44	Maidenhead United	0–2	Leatherhead
45	Malden Town	1–1	Corinthian Casuals
46	Matlock Town	2–2	Macclesfield Town
47	Merthyr Tydfil	1–3	Cheltenham Town
48	Metropolitan Police	2–2	Kingstonian
49	Mossley	1–1	Northwich Victoria
50	Nelson	0–4	Morecambe
51	Nuneaton Borough	8–2	Loughborough United
52	Oswestry Town	2–4	New Brighton
53	Portland United	0–2	Poole Town
54	Rhyl	3–3	Runcorn
55	Rossendale United	3–3	Lancaster City
56	Rushden Town	4–0	March Town United
57	Sittingbourne	1–3	Ramsgate Athletic
58	Stanley United	4–4	Stockton
59	Stratford Town Amateurs	0–2	Rugby Town
60	Sudbury Town	1–2	Lowestoft Town
61	Trowbridge Town	5–0	Stonehouse
62	Tunbridge Wells Rangers	0–4	Margate
63	Walthamstow Avenue	0–2	Stevenage Town
64	Ware	2–2	Edgware Town
65	Waterlooville	0–2	Salisbury
66	Whitby Town	1–1	Billingham Synthonia
67	Windsor & Eton	2–2	Hertford Town
68	Witton Albion	4–1	Hyde United
69	Woking	2–1	Littlehampton Town
70	Wolverton Town & B R	4–1	Harrow Borough
71	Worcester City	0–1	Tamworth
72	Worksop Town	3–0	Sutton Town

=== Replays ===
Tie	Home team	Score	Away team
8	Tow Law Town	2–3	Blyth Spartans
17	Gloucester City	0–3	Cinderford Town
29	Bletchley Town	0–1	Finchley
30	Netherfield	2–1	Fleetwood
32	Barton Town	0–2	Goole Town
42	Skelmersdale United	5–1	Lostock Gralam
45	Corinthian Casuals	3–2	Malden Town
46	Macclesfield Town	6–1	Matlock Town
48	Kingstonian	2–1	Metropolitan Police
49	Northwich Victoria	3–1	Mossley
54	Runcorn	2–2	Rhyl
55	Lancaster City	2–1	Rossendale United
58	Stockton	3–1	Stanley United
64	Edgware Town	1–0	Ware
66	Billingham Synthonia	1–0	Whitby Town
67	Hertford Town	4–1	Windsor & Eton

=== 2nd replay ===
Tie	Home team	Score	Away team
54	Rhyl	3–1	Runcorn

== 3rd qualifying round ==
=== Ties ===
Tie	Home team	Score	Away team
1	Ashford Town (Kent)	1–0	Margate
2	Bangor City	6–6	New Brighton
3	Barnet	4–1	Edgware Town
4	Billingham Synthonia	4–0	Annfield Plain
5	Blyth Spartans	4–2	Stockton
6	Burton Albion	0–1	Nuneaton Borough
7	Bury Town	3–3	Cambridge City
8	Cheshunt	0–0	Hertford Town
9	Chorley	3–0	Lancaster City
10	Cinderford Town	2–3	Cheltenham Town
11	Eastbourne United	1–1	Crawley Town
12	Enfield	2–2	Stevenage Town
13	Fareham Town	2–2	Salisbury
14	Finchley	3–2	Slough Town
15	Gainsborough Trinity	1–1	Farsley Celtic
16	Goole Town	4–0	Bridlington Trinity
17	Hastings United	2–1	Ramsgate Athletic
18	Hednesford	6–0	Brierley Hill Alliance
19	Hemel Hempstead	2–3	Chesham United
20	Horden Colliery Welfare	0–1	Bishop Auckland
21	Hornchurch	2–2	Bexley United
22	Horsham	2–1	Woking
23	King's Lynn	2–5	Boston United
24	Kingstonian	0–2	Sutton United
25	Leatherhead	2–1	Corinthian Casuals
26	Lowestoft Town	4–4	Haverhill Rovers
27	Macclesfield Town	3–1	Worksop Town
28	Minehead	5–0	Bideford
29	Morecambe	2–1	Netherfield
30	Northwich Victoria	1–6	Witton Albion
31	Oxford City	3–2	Wolverton Town & B R
32	Poole Town	1–0	Dorchester Town
33	Rhyl	2–0	Skelmersdale United
34	Rugby Town	2–2	Tamworth
35	Rushden Town	0–3	St Neots Town
36	Trowbridge Town	0–3	Welton Rovers

=== Replays ===
Tie	Home team	Score	Away team
2	New Brighton	0–1	Bangor City
7	Cambridge City	1–0	Bury Town
8	Hertford Town	0–1	Cheshunt
11	Crawley Town	2–2	Eastbourne United
12	Stevenage Town	1–1	Enfield
13	Salisbury	1–2	Fareham Town
15	Farsley Celtic	0–1	Gainsborough Trinity
21	Bexley United	0–3	Hornchurch
26	Haverhill Rovers	4–6	Lowestoft Town
34	Tamworth	2–1	Rugby Town

=== 2nd replays ===
Tie	Home team	Score	Away team
11	Eastbourne United	3–2	Crawley Town
12	Enfield	2–0	Stevenage Town

== 4th qualifying round ==
The teams that given byes to this round are Crook Town, Wimbledon, Gateshead, Wycombe Wanderers, Yeovil Town, Hereford United, South Shields, Chelmsford City, Bath City, Kettering Town, Weymouth, Romford, Bedford Town, Wigan Athletic, Corby Town, Dartford, South Liverpool, Gravesend & Northfleet, Folkestone, Guildford City, Grantham, Altrincham, Kidderminster Harriers and Wisbech Town.

=== Ties ===
Tie	Home team	Score	Away team
1	Altrincham	2–4	Wigan Athletic
2	Barnet	1–2	Enfield
3	Bath City	2–2	Weymouth
4	Bedford Town	1–1	Romford
5	Boston United	1–4	Grantham
6	Cheltenham Town	3–3	Yeovil Town
7	Chorley	3–3	Bangor City
8	Corby Town	0–2	Cambridge City
9	Crook Town	4–4	Bishop Auckland
10	Dartford	2–2	Wimbledon
11	Folkestone	3–2	Gravesend & Northfleet
12	Gainsborough Trinity	1–0	Goole Town
13	Gateshead	1–3	Blyth Spartans
14	Guildford City	1–1	Ashford Town (Kent)
15	Hereford United	1–1	Kidderminster Harriers
16	Hornchurch	0–4	Chelmsford City
17	Horsham	2–1	Hastings United
18	Leatherhead	1–2	Chesham United
19	Lowestoft Town	3–1	Kettering Town
20	Macclesfield Town	1–1	Nuneaton Borough
21	Oxford City	5–1	Finchley
22	Poole Town	1–0	Minehead
23	South Liverpool	1–1	Morecambe
24	South Shields	2–0	Billingham Synthonia
25	St Neots Town	2–0	Wisbech Town
26	Sutton United	7–2	Eastbourne United
27	Tamworth	1–1	Hednesford
28	Welton Rovers	4–1	Fareham Town
29	Witton Albion	4–2	Rhyl
30	Wycombe Wanderers	8–0	Cheshunt

=== Replays ===
Tie	Home team	Score	Away team
3	Weymouth	0–1	Bath City
4	Romford	1–2	Bedford Town
6	Yeovil Town	3–1	Cheltenham Town
7	Bangor City	4–3	Chorley
9	Bishop Auckland	2–0	Crook Town
10	Wimbledon	3–0	Dartford
14	Ashford Town (Kent)	2–0	Guildford City
15	Kidderminster Harriers	2–4	Hereford United
20	Nuneaton Borough	2–0	Macclesfield Town
23	Morecambe	1–0	South Liverpool
27	Hednesford Town	1–3	Tamworth

== 1966–67 FA Cup ==
See 1966-67 FA Cup for details of the rounds from the first round proper onwards.
