= 1960–61 FA Cup qualifying rounds =

Tournament details
- Country: England; Wales

The FA Cup 1960–61 is the 80th season of the world's oldest football knockout competition; The Football Association Challenge Cup, often abbreviated to the FA Cup, or FACC, for short. The large number of clubs entering the tournament from lower down the English football league system meant that the competition started with a number of preliminary and qualifying rounds. The 30 victorious teams from the fourth round qualifying progressed to the first round proper.

== Preliminary round ==
=== Ties ===
| Tie | Home team | Score | Away team |
|---|---|---|---|
| 1 | Lowestoft Town | 5–1 | Sheringham |
| 2 | Matlock Town | 6–0 | Creswell Colliery |
| 3 | Rossendale United | 1–1 | Mossley |
| 4 | South Liverpool | 1–5 | Pwllheli & District |
| 5 | Stourbridge | 1–4 | Oswestry Town |
| 6 | Wigan Athletic | 2–0 | Prescot Cables |

=== Replay ===
| Tie | Home team | Score | Away team |
|---|---|---|---|
| 3 | Mossley | 5–2 | Rossendale United |

== 1st qualifying round ==
=== Ties ===
| Tie | Home team | Score | Away team |
|---|---|---|---|
| 1 | Abingdon Town | 4–2 | Banbury Spencer |
| 2 | Arundel | 3–0 | Crawley Town |
| 3 | Ashington | 2–1 | Newburn |
| 4 | Atherstone Town | 0–3 | Hinckley Athletic |
| 5 | Aveley | 2–5 | Brentwood & Warley |
| 6 | Barnet | 5–1 | Hounslow Town |
| 7 | Barry Town | 9–0 | Ebbw Vale |
| 8 | Bedlington Mechanics | 5–2 | Billingham Synthonia |
| 9 | Bedworth Town | 4–1 | Brierley Hill Alliance |
| 10 | Belper Town | 3–2 | South Normanton Miners Welfare |
| 11 | Betteshanger Colliery Welfare | 1–7 | Deal Town |
| 12 | Bridlington Town | 6–0 | Durham City |
| 13 | Bromley | 2–3 | Kingstonian |
| 14 | Burscough | 2–1 | Milnthorpe Corinthians |
| 15 | Bury Town | 0–3 | Cambridge City |
| 16 | Buxton | 1–3 | Linotype & Machinery |
| 17 | Calne & Harris United | 2–5 | Devizes Town |
| 18 | Cambridge United | 5–1 | Newmarket Town |
| 19 | Chesham United | 5–1 | Aylesbury United |
| 20 | Cheshunt | 0–2 | Bishop's Stortford |
| 21 | Clapton | 1–0 | Leyton |
| 22 | Corby Town | 1–2 | Kettering Town |
| 23 | Cradley Heath{1} | 1–3 | Redditch |
| 24 | Cray Wanderers | 4–5 | Dartford |
| 25 | Darwen | 0–1 | Bacup Borough |
| 26 | Dover | 4–1 | Canterbury City |
| 27 | Earlestown | 4–3 | Altrincham |
| 28 | East End Park W M C | 0–2 | Retford Town |
| 29 | Eastbourne | 2–1 | Newhaven |
| 30 | Eastbourne United | 1–2 | Tunbridge Wells United |
| 31 | Edgware Town | 3–1 | Finchley |
| 32 | Ely City | 6–2 | Chatteris Town |
| 33 | Epsom | 0–1 | Carshalton Athletic |
| 34 | Erith & Belvedere | 3–6 | Bexleyheath & Welling |
| 35 | Evesham United | 1–3 | Bilston |
| 36 | Eynesbury Rovers | 1–9 | St Neots Town |
| 37 | Fareham Town | 4–3 | Alton Town |
| 38 | Ferryhill Athletic | 3–2 | Evenwood Town |
| 39 | Fleetwood | 3–2 | Clitheroe |
| 40 | Flint Town United | 1–2 | Bangor City |
| 41 | Gainsborough Trinity | 0–3 | Denaby United |
| 42 | Gloucester City | 1–4 | Cheltenham Town |
| 43 | Goole Town | 2–4 | Frickley Colliery |
| 44 | Gorleston | 0–1 | Bungay Town |
| 45 | Grantham | 3–4 | Skegness Town |
| 46 | Grays Athletic | 2–3 | Barking |
| 47 | Harwich & Parkeston | 0–4 | Clacton Town |
| 48 | Hednesford Town | 2–3 | Halesowen Town |
| 49 | Hertford Town | 5–1 | Ware |
| 50 | Histon | 1–2 | March Town United |
| 51 | Hitchin Town | 4–0 | Biggleswade & District |
| 52 | Holbeach United | 7–1 | Alford United |
| 53 | Hornchurch & Upminster | 1–0 | Ford United |
| 54 | Horsham | 3–1 | Bognor Regis Town |
| 55 | Ilkeston Town | 3–1 | Burton Albion |
| 56 | Leatherhead | 1–2 | Dorking |
| 57 | Leytonstone | 3–0 | Dagenham |
| 58 | Littlehampton Town | 6–3 | Lancing Athletic |
| 59 | Lockheed Leamington | 4–0 | Rugby Town |
| 60 | Lostock Gralam | 0–0 | Congleton Town |
| 61 | Loughborough United | 5–1 | Long Eaton United |
| 62 | Louth United | 1–0 | Spalding United |
| 63 | Lovells Athletic | 2–3 | Llanelli |
| 64 | Lowestoft Town | 4–1 | Great Yarmouth Town |
| 65 | Lytham | 2–4 | Hyde United |
| 66 | Maidstone United | 2–1 | Gravesend & Northfleet |
| 67 | Marine | 2–0 | Horwich R M I |
| 68 | Marlow | 0–1 | Slough Town |
| 69 | Matlock Town | 0–1 | Heanor Town |
| 70 | Melksham Town | 3–2 | Westbury United |
| 71 | Merthyr Tydfil | 5–2 | Stonehouse |
| 72 | Moor Green | 2–3 | Kidderminster Harriers |
| 73 | Morecambe | 7–4 | Lancaster City |
| 74 | Mossley | 0–1 | Chorley |
| 75 | Nelson | 6–2 | Stalybridge Celtic |
| 76 | Netherfield | 5–0 | Penrith |
| 77 | New Brighton | 3–1 | Llandudno |
| 78 | Newport I O W | 1–2 | Cowes |
| 79 | North Shields | 6–2 | Spennymoor United |
| 80 | Northwich Victoria | 0–3 | Macclesfield |
| 81 | Nuneaton Borough | 1–4 | Tamworth |
| 82 | Oswestry Town | 3–2 | Bromsgrove Rovers |
| 83 | Oxford City | 6–1 | Huntley & Palmers |
| 84 | Poole Town | 6–3 | Bridport |
| 85 | Pwllheli & District | 1–4 | Ellesmere Port Town |
| 86 | Rainham Town | 2–3 | Ilford |
| 87 | Ramsgate Athletic | 1–1 | Folkestone |
| 88 | Romford | 7–0 | Wembley |
| 89 | Runcorn | 6–0 | Stork |
| 90 | Rushden Town | 1–0 | Rothwell Town |
| 91 | Scarborough | 4–1 | Whitley Bay |
| 92 | Selby Town | 3–2 | Yorkshire Amateur |
| 93 | Sheppey United | 1–4 | Sittingbourne |
| 94 | Shirebrook Miners Welfare | 1–6 | Alfreton Town |
| 95 | Shotton Colliery Welfare | 2–2 | Murton Colliery Welfare |
| 96 | Skelmersdale United | 3–2 | St Helens Town |
| 97 | Snowdown Colliery Welfare | 6–1 | Whitstable |
| 98 | Southall | 2–1 | Hayes |
| 99 | Southwick | 2–2 | Worthing |
| 100 | St Albans City | 2–1 | Dunstable Town |
| 101 | Stafford Rangers | 0–1 | Wellington Town |
| 102 | Staines Town | 0–2 | Dulwich Hamlet |
| 103 | Stamford | 2–1 | Wellingborough Town |
| 104 | Stevenage Town | 2–2 | Letchworth Town |
| 105 | Stowmarket | 2–3 | Sudbury Town |
| 106 | Street | 0–8 | Weston Super Mare |
| 107 | Sutton United | 4–0 | Redhill |
| 108 | Tilbury | 2–2 | Woodford Town |
| 109 | Tonbridge | 2–2 | Bexhill Town |
| 110 | Trowbridge Town | 1–1 | Chippenham Town |
| 111 | Truro City | 2–2 | Bideford |
| 112 | Uxbridge | 2–1 | Yiewsley |
| 113 | Vauxhall Motors | 2–0 | Wolverton Town & B R |
| 114 | Wadebridge Town | 2–7 | St Blazey |
| 115 | Walton & Hersham | 5–1 | Metropolitan Police |
| 116 | Warminster Town | 3–1 | Portland United |
| 117 | Wealdstone | 1–2 | Harrow Town |
| 118 | West Auckland Town | 2–4 | Annfield Plain |
| 119 | Whitby Town | 1–2 | Stockton |
| 120 | Wigan Athletic | 3–2 | Ashton United |
| 121 | Wimbledon | 5–1 | Woking |
| 122 | Windsor & Eton | 2–4 | Maidenhead United |
| 123 | Winsford United | 1–0 | Witton Albion |
| 124 | Witney Town | 2–5 | Wokingham Town |
| 125 | Worksop Town | 2–2 | Sutton Town |

=== Replays ===
| Tie | Home team | Score | Away team |
|---|---|---|---|
| 60 | Congleton Town | 2–0 | Lostock Gralam |
| 87 | Folkestone | 4–1 | Ramsgate Athletic |
| 95 | Murton Colliery Welfare | 3–1 | Shotton Colliery Welfare |
| 99 | Worthing | 2–3 | Southwick |
| 104 | Letchworth Town | 2–6 | Stevenage Town |
| 108 | Woodford Town | 1–2 | Tilbury |
| 109 | Bexhill Town | 1–2 | Tonbridge |
| 110 | Chippenham Town | 0–1 | Trowbridge Town |
| 111 | Bideford | 4–2 | Truro City |
| 125 | Sutton Town | 3–0 | Worksop Town |

== 2nd qualifying round ==
=== Ties ===
| Tie | Home team | Score | Away team |
|---|---|---|---|
| 1 | Alfreton Town | 1–7 | Belper Town |
| 2 | Annfield Plain | 1–4 | Shildon |
| 3 | Ashington | 6–1 | Silksworth Colliery Welfare |
| 4 | Bacup Borough | 0–2 | Nelson |
| 5 | Bangor City | 2–1 | Runcorn |
| 6 | Barking | 3–3 | Tilbury |
| 7 | Barnstaple Town | 1–1 | St Blazey |
| 8 | Bexleyheath & Welling | 1–0 | Sittingbourne |
| 9 | Bideford | 5–2 | Penzance |
| 10 | Bilston | 1–4 | Lockheed Leamington |
| 11 | Bishop's Stortford | 4–2 | Barnet |
| 12 | Bridgwater Town | 4–1 | Minehead |
| 13 | Bridlington Town | 5–0 | Murton Colliery Welfare |
| 14 | Bungay Town | 4–2 | Sudbury Town |
| 15 | Cambridge United | 7–3 | March Town United |
| 16 | Carshalton Athletic | 5–2 | Slough Town |
| 17 | Cheltenham Town | 4–0 | Merthyr Tydfil |
| 18 | Chesham United | 2–2 | Wokingham Town |
| 19 | Chichester City | 6–3 | Cowes |
| 20 | Clacton Town | 6–2 | Lowestoft Town |
| 21 | Congleton Town | 3–1 | Winsford United |
| 22 | Consett | 3–2 | North Shields |
| 23 | Dorking | 4–3 | Wimbledon |
| 24 | Dover | 5–3 | Snowdown Colliery Welfare |
| 25 | Earlestown | 2–4 | Skelmersdale United |
| 26 | Eastbourne | 0–7 | Hastings United |
| 27 | Ely City | 1–8 | Cambridge City |
| 28 | Fareham Town | 3–3 | Andover |
| 29 | Fleetwood | 0–4 | Netherfield |
| 30 | Folkestone | 5–1 | Deal Town |
| 31 | Frickley Colliery | 3–0 | Denaby United |
| 32 | Glastonbury | 2–2 | Weston Super Mare |
| 33 | Halesowen Town | 5–2 | Bedworth Town |
| 34 | Harrow Town | 3–2 | Hertford Town |
| 35 | Hitchin Town | 3–0 | Vauxhall Motors |
| 36 | Horden Colliery Welfare | 3–1 | Bedlington Mechanics |
| 37 | Hornchurch & Upminster | 2–1 | Clapton |
| 38 | Horsham | 10–1 | Southwick |
| 39 | Hyde United | 1–1 | Chorley |
| 40 | Ilford | 0–2 | Brentwood & Warley |
| 41 | Ilkeston Town | 3–1 | Tamworth |
| 42 | Kettering Town | 3–0 | Stamford |
| 43 | Kidderminster Harriers | 2–1 | Oswestry Town |
| 44 | Leytonstone | 1–3 | Romford |
| 45 | Littlehampton Town | 3–2 | Arundel |
| 46 | Llanelli | 0–0 | Barry Town |
| 47 | Loughborough United | 2–1 | Hinckley Athletic |
| 48 | Louth United | 0–3 | Holbeach United |
| 49 | Macclesfield | 1–1 | Linotype & Machinery |
| 50 | Maidenhead United | 4–0 | Uxbridge |
| 51 | Maidstone United | 1–3 | Dartford |
| 52 | Marine | 1–5 | Wigan Athletic |
| 53 | Melksham Town | 2–5 | Chippenham United |
| 54 | Morecambe | 2–2 | Burscough |
| 55 | New Brighton | 0–0 | Ellesmere Port Town |
| 56 | Oxford City | 1–1 | Abingdon Town |
| 57 | Poole Town | 4–1 | Frome Town |
| 58 | Redditch | 0–3 | Wellington Town |
| 59 | Retford Town | 1–2 | Selby Town |
| 60 | Rushden Town | 0–5 | St Neots Town |
| 61 | Scarborough | 5–2 | Willington |
| 62 | Skegness Town | 5–1 | Ransome & Marles |
| 63 | South Bank | 3–4 | Ferryhill Athletic |
| 64 | Southall | 2–2 | Edgware Town |
| 65 | Stevenage Town | 1–1 | St Albans City |
| 66 | Stockton | 2–2 | Boldon Colliery Welfare |
| 67 | Sutton Town | 4–2 | Heanor Town |
| 68 | Sutton United | 4–2 | Dulwich Hamlet |
| 69 | Trowbridge Town | 2–2 | Devizes Town |
| 70 | Tunbridge Wells United | 1–2 | Tonbridge |
| 71 | Walton & Hersham | 3–1 | Kingstonian |
| 72 | Weymouth | 5–1 | Warminster Town |

=== Replays ===
| Tie | Home team | Score | Away team |
|---|---|---|---|
| 6 | Tilbury | 3–1 | Barking |
| 7 | St Blazey | 1–2 | Barnstaple Town |
| 18 | Wokingham Town | 1–2 | Chesham United |
| 28 | Andover | 3–2 | Fareham Town |
| 32 | Weston Super Mare | 2–0 | Glastonbury |
| 39 | Chorley | 3–1 | Hyde United |
| 46 | Barry Town | 1–2 | Llanelli |
| 49 | Linotype & Machinery | 0–3 | Macclesfield |
| 54 | Burscough | 1–2 | Morecambe |
| 55 | Ellesmere Port Town | 0–1 | New Brighton |
| 56 | Abingdon Town | 2–1 | Oxford City |
| 64 | Edgware Town | 3–2 | Southall |
| 65 | St Albans City | 2–2 | Stevenage Town |
| 66 | Boldon Colliery Welfare | 3–1 | Stockton |
| 69 | Devizes Town | 2–3 | Trowbridge Town |

=== 2nd replays ===
| Tie | Home team | Score | Away team |
|---|---|---|---|
| 65 | St Albans City | 3–2 | Stevenage Town |

== 3rd qualifying round ==
=== Ties ===
| Tie | Home team | Score | Away team |
|---|---|---|---|
| 1 | Bangor City | 3–0 | New Brighton |
| 2 | Barnstaple Town | 1–0 | Bideford |
| 3 | Belper Town | 1–2 | Sutton Town |
| 4 | Bexleyheath & Welling | 5–0 | Dartford |
| 5 | Bridlington Town | 11–2 | Boldon Colliery Welfare |
| 6 | Bungay Town | 0–1 | Clacton Town |
| 7 | Cambridge United | 1–1 | Cambridge City |
| 8 | Carshalton Athletic | 2–2 | Sutton United |
| 9 | Cheltenham Town | 2–0 | Llanelli |
| 10 | Chesham United | 1–2 | Abingdon Town |
| 11 | Chichester City | 2–1 | Andover |
| 12 | Congleton Town | 0–3 | Macclesfield |
| 13 | Consett | 1–2 | Scarborough |
| 14 | Dorking | 1–1 | Walton & Hersham |
| 15 | Dover | 1–0 | Folkestone |
| 16 | Ferryhill Athletic | 2–1 | Ashington |
| 17 | Harrow Town | 8–4 | Bishop's Stortford |
| 18 | Hitchin Town | 4–0 | St Albans City |
| 19 | Holbeach United | 1–0 | Skegness Town |
| 20 | Horden Colliery Welfare | 5–1 | Shildon |
| 21 | Horsham | 2–3 | Littlehampton Town |
| 22 | Ilkeston Town | 0–3 | Loughborough United |
| 23 | Kettering Town | 2–0 | St Neots Town |
| 24 | Lockheed Leamington | 6–1 | Halesowen Town |
| 25 | Maidenhead United | 3–3 | Edgware Town |
| 26 | Nelson | 7–4 | Chorley |
| 27 | Netherfield | 2–0 | Morecambe |
| 28 | Romford | 3–0 | Hornchurch & Upminster |
| 29 | Selby Town | 1–3 | Frickley Colliery |
| 30 | Skelmersdale United | 0–0 | Wigan Athletic |
| 31 | Tilbury | 1–3 | Brentwood & Warley |
| 32 | Tonbridge | 1–2 | Hastings United |
| 33 | Trowbridge Town | 2–1 | Chippenham United |
| 34 | Wellington Town | 1–0 | Kidderminster Harriers |
| 35 | Weston Super Mare | 0–1 | Bridgwater Town |
| 36 | Weymouth | 1–1 | Poole Town |

=== Replays ===
| Tie | Home team | Score | Away team |
|---|---|---|---|
| 7 | Cambridge City | 1–1 | Cambridge United |
| 8 | Sutton United | 3–0 | Carshalton Athletic |
| 14 | Walton & Hersham | 2–1 | Dorking |
| 25 | Edgware Town | 0–2 | Maidenhead United |
| 30 | Wigan Athletic | 2–1 | Skelmersdale United |
| 36 | Poole Town | 3–4 | Weymouth |

=== 2nd replay ===
| Tie | Home team | Score | Away team |
|---|---|---|---|
| 7 | Cambridge City | 1–2 | Cambridge United |

== 4th qualifying round ==
The teams that were given byes to this round were Crook Town, Bishop Auckland, Wycombe Wanderers, Bedford Town, Yeovil Town, Hereford United, South Shields, Worcester City, Oxford United, King's Lynn, Guildford City, Chelmsford City, Rhyl, Blyth Spartans, Dorchester Town, Margate, Bath City, Boston United, Wisbech Town, Tooting & Mitcham United, Walthamstow Avenue, Enfield, Salisbury and Ashford Town (Kent).

=== Ties ===
| Tie | Home team | Score | Away team |
|---|---|---|---|
| 1 | Ashford Town (Kent) | 1–1 | Margate |
| 2 | Bangor City | 1–0 | Netherfield |
| 3 | Barnstaple Town | 1–2 | Bath City |
| 4 | Bedford Town | 1–4 | King's Lynn |
| 5 | Bexleyheath & Welling | 1–3 | Sutton United |
| 6 | Brentwood & Warley | 0–4 | Oxford United |
| 7 | Bridgwater Town | 0–0 | Cheltenham Town |
| 8 | Bridlington Town | 5–3 | South Shields |
| 9 | Chelmsford City | 3–3 | Wisbech Town |
| 10 | Chichester City | 4–1 | Dorchester Town |
| 11 | Clacton Town | 2–1 | Cambridge United |
| 12 | Crook Town | 1–2 | Bishop Auckland |
| 13 | Dover | 2–1 | Littlehampton Town |
| 14 | Harrow Town | 2–3 | Maidenhead United |
| 15 | Hastings United | 2–1 | Guildford City |
| 16 | Hitchin Town | 2–0 | Abingdon Town |
| 17 | Holbeach United | 1–2 | Loughborough United |
| 18 | Horden Colliery Welfare | 1–3 | Blyth Spartans |
| 19 | Kettering Town | 1–1 | Boston United |
| 20 | Lockheed Leamington | 1–2 | Hereford United |
| 21 | Nelson | 2–3 | Macclesfield |
| 22 | Romford | 2–1 | Enfield |
| 23 | Scarborough | 1–0 | Ferryhill Athletic |
| 24 | Sutton Town | 2–1 | Frickley Colliery |
| 25 | Trowbridge Town | 0–4 | Yeovil Town |
| 26 | Walthamstow Avenue | 4–1 | Walton & Hersham |
| 27 | Wellington Town | 1–1 | Worcester City |
| 28 | Weymouth | 1–1 | Salisbury |
| 29 | Wigan Athletic | 1–1 | Rhyl |
| 30 | Wycombe Wanderers | 2–1 | Tooting & Mitcham United |

=== Replays ===
| Tie | Home team | Score | Away team |
|---|---|---|---|
| 1 | Margate | 1–2 | Ashford Town (Kent) |
| 7 | Cheltenham Town | 1–2 | Bridgwater Town |
| 9 | Wisbech Town | 1–4 | Chelmsford City |
| 19 | Boston United | 1–3 | Kettering Town |
| 27 | Worcester City | 3–2 | Wellington Town |
| 28 | Salisbury | 0–2 | Weymouth |
| 29 | Rhyl | 2–1 | Wigan Athletic |

== 1960–61 FA Cup ==
See 1960-61 FA Cup for details of the rounds from the first round proper onwards.
