= 1959–60 FA Cup qualifying rounds =

Tournament details
- Country: England; Wales

The FA Cup 1959–60 is the 79th season of the world's oldest football knockout competition; The Football Association Challenge Cup, or FA Cup for short. The large number of clubs entering the tournament from lower down the English football league system meant that the competition started with a number of preliminary and qualifying rounds. The 30 victorious teams from the fourth round qualifying progressed to the first round proper.

== Preliminary round ==
=== Ties ===
Tie	Home team	Score	Away team
1	Aveley	1–2	Leytonstone
2	Betteshanger Colliery Welfare	2–2	Ramsgate Athletic
3	Bideford	4–3	Tavistock
4	Bilston	3–2	Lockheed Leamington
5	Bognor Regis Town	1–2	Eastbourne
6	Brentwood & Warley	1–2	Tilbury
7	Bromley	5–0	Redhill
8	Bromsgrove Rovers	2–1	Stafford Rangers
9	Brush Sports	2–1	Long Eaton United
10	Chatham Town	0–3	Sheppey United
11	Cheltenham Town	1–0	Lovells Athletic
12	Crawley Town	6–1	Southwick
13	Droylsden	2–1	Darwen
14	Erith & Belvedere	0–2	Tonbridge
15	Ford United	1–2	Hendon
16	Hayes	2–1	Wealdstone
17	Horsham	1–3	Hastings United
18	Lancing Athletic	2–1	Newhaven
19	Littlehampton Town	1–2	Arundel
20	Lostock Gralam	0–1	Linotype & Machinery
21	Maidenhead United	4–1	Huntley & Palmers
22	Metropolitan Police	1–3	Carshalton Athletic
23	Nelson	0–0	Ashton United
24	New Brighton	1–0	Marine
25	Rossendale United	4–4	Lytham
26	Skelmersdale United	0–0	Mossley
27	South Liverpool	3–4	Pwllheli & District
28	St Helens Town	0–2	Earlestown
29	Stockton Heath	0–3	Congleton Town
30	Stork	1–2	Runcorn
31	Walton & Hersham	0–2	Kingstonian
32	Wimbledon	6–0	Dorking
33	Windsor & Eton	2–3	Aylesbury United
34	Winsford United	0–3	Northwich Victoria
35	Witney Town	0–1	Oxford City
36	Witton Albion	3–3	Stalybridge Celtic
37	Woking	3–0	Epsom
38	Wokingham Town	5–2	Slough Town
39	Worthing	3–1	Eastbourne United

=== Replays ===
Tie	Home team	Score	Away team
2	Ramsgate Athletic	0–1	Betteshanger Colliery Welfare
23	Ashton United	1–2	Nelson
25	Lytham	2–1	Rossendale United
26	Mossley	3–0	Skelmersdale United
36	Stalybridge Celtic	1–2	Witton Albion

== 1st qualifying round ==
=== Ties ===
Tie	Home team	Score	Away team
1	Abingdon Town	1–1	Maidenhead United
2	Altrincham	7–1	Droylsden
3	Andover	0–0	Gosport Borough Athletic
4	Aylesbury United	1–4	Oxford City
5	Bangor City	3–2	New Brighton
6	Barking	0–1	Leytonstone
7	Barnstaple Town w/o-scr Newquay		
8	Basingstoke Town	5–2	Alton Town
9	Bexleyheath & Welling	5–1	Sittingbourne
10	Billingham Synthonia	3–5	Murton Colliery Welfare
11	Bourne Town	4–1	Louth United
12	Bridgwater Town	2–1	Minehead
13	Brierley Hill Alliance	2–2	Rugby Town
14	Brigg Town	1–1	Ashby Institute
15	Burton Albion	1–4	Nuneaton Borough
16	Buxton	4–1	Linotype & Machinery
17	Canterbury City	1–0	Snowdown Colliery Welfare
18	Carshalton Athletic	2–4	Kingstonian
19	Chatteris Town	1–2	March Town United
20	Cinderford Town	1–1	Merthyr Tydfil
21	Clapton	2–4	Hornchurch & Upminster
22	Congleton Town	0–3	Northwich Victoria
23	Consett	2–1	Evenwood Town
24	Cowes	2–0	Newport I O W
25	Cradley Heath	0–5	Stourbridge
26	Dagenham	1–1	Walthamstow Avenue
27	Dartford	4–1	Sheppey United
28	Deal Town	0–1	Ashford Town (Kent)
29	Devizes Town	3–2	Chippenham United
30	Dover	0–0	Betteshanger Colliery Welfare
31	Earlestown	5–2	Pwllheli & District
32	Ebbw Vale	2–2	Barry Town
33	Edgware Town	0–1	Hendon
34	Ely City	0–3	Cambridge United
35	Evesham United	2–0	Bedworth Town
36	Farsley Celtic	5–2	Upton Colliery
37	Ferryhill Athletic	0–0	Bridlington Town
38	Fleetwood	2–2	Clitheroe
39	Frickley Colliery	1–0	East End Park W M C
40	Gainsborough Trinity	4–1	Alford United
41	Glastonbury	2–1	Street
42	Gloucester City	1–3	Cheltenham Town
43	Gorleston	2–2	Diss Town
44	Gravesend & Northfleet	2–0	Tonbridge
45	Grays Athletic	2–1	Tilbury
46	Gresley Rovers	2–2	Atherstone Town
47	Halesowen Town	2–4	Bilston
48	Hastings United	4–1	Bexhill Town
49	Haywards Heath	3–3	Eastbourne
50	Hertford Town	7–0	Cheshunt
51	Hinckley Athletic	0–1	Brush Sports
52	Histon	1–4	Cambridge City
53	Hoddesdon Town	2–0	St Albans City
54	Horden Colliery Welfare	2–2	North Shields
55	Horwich R M I	1–2	Bacup Borough
56	Hounslow Town	6–0	Wembley
57	Ilford	4–1	Rainham Town
58	Kidderminster Harriers	7–1	Bourneville Athletic
59	Lancaster City	2–4	Burscough
60	Lancing Athletic	2–3	Arundel
61	Letchworth Town	5–0	Dunstable Town
62	Lowestoft Town	6–2	Sheringham
63	Macclesfield	2–3	Ellesmere Port Town
64	Marlow	0–3	Banbury Spencer
65	Melksham Town	2–4	Trowbridge Town
66	Milnthorpe Corinthians	0–3	Netherfield
67	Moor Green	2–4	Bromsgrove Rovers
68	Mossley	2–1	Chorley
69	Nelson	2–2	Lytham
70	Newmarket Town	1–4	Clacton Town
71	Norton Woodseats	2–1	Boots Athletic
72	Penrith	1–0	Morecambe
73	Penzance	3–5	Bideford
74	Portland United	2–3	Salisbury
75	Prescot Cables	4–0	Flint Town United
76	Retford Town	2–2	Heanor Town
77	Romford	1–3	Finchley
78	Runcorn	3–2	Llandudno
79	Rushden Town	3–2	Stamford
80	Scarborough	2–2	Ashington
81	Selby Town	1–3	Denaby United
82	Sheffield	2–3	Worksop Town
83	Shirebrook Miners Welfare	1–1	Sutton Town
84	Shotton Colliery Welfare	0–2	Spennymoor United
85	Skegness Town	5–0	Grantham
86	South Normanton Miners Welfare	3–0	Ransome & Marles
87	Southall	1–0	Harrow Town
88	St Neots Town	1–1	Holbeach United
89	Staines Town	1–2	Hayes
90	Stevenage Town	0–1	Vauxhall Motors
91	Stocksbridge Works	1–3	Matlock Town
92	Stonehouse	0–5	Llanelli
93	Stowmarket	0–3	Sudbury Town
94	Sutton Coldfield Town	2–3	Hednesford Town
95	Sutton United	6–0	Leatherhead
96	Tamworth	2–2	Ilkeston Town
97	Taunton	7–0	Weston Super Mare
98	Thetford Town	2–4	Great Yarmouth Town
99	Tow Law Town	2–1	Whitby Town
100	Truro City w/o-scr Ilfracombe Town		
101	Tunbridge Wells United	1–1	Maidstone United
102	Wadebridge Town	3–2	St Blazey
103	Ware	1–7	Enfield
104	Warminster Town	1–1	Frome Town
105	Wellingborough Town	3–2	Rothwell Town
106	Wellington Town	1–1	Oswestry Town
107	Westbury United	3–1	Chippenham Town
108	Whitstable	1–6	Folkestone
109	Whitton United	1–2	Harwich & Parkeston
110	Wimbledon	3–0	Bromley
111	Winchester City	1–4	Fareham Town
112	Witton Albion	2–1	Hyde United
113	Woking	3–0	Dulwich Hamlet
114	Wokingham Town	4–1	Chesham United
115	Wolverton Town & B R	2–1	Hitchin Town
116	Woodford Town	1–1	Leyton
117	Worthing	1–6	Crawley Town
118	Yiewsley	2–1	Uxbridge
119	Yorkshire Amateur	1–3	Goole Town

=== Replays ===
Tie	Home team	Score	Away team
1	Maidenhead United	3–1	Abingdon Town
3	Gosport Borough Athletic	0–1	Andover
13	Rugby Town	1–0	Brierley Hill Alliance
14	Ashby Institute	1–5	Brigg Town
20	Merthyr Tydfil	2–0	Cinderford Town
26	Walthamstow Avenue	4–0	Dagenham
30	Betteshanger Colliery Welfare	3–1	Dover
32	Barry Town	6–1	Ebbw Vale
37	Bridlington Town	1–2	Ferryhill Athletic
38	Clitheroe	1–0	Fleetwood
43	Diss Town	1–2	Gorleston
46	Atherstone Town	2–0	Gresley Rovers
49	Eastbourne	4–2	Haywards Heath
54	North Shields	3–1	Horden Colliery Welfare
69	Lytham	2–0	Nelson
76	Heanor Town	4–0	Retford Town
80	Ashington	0–0	Scarborough
83	Sutton Town	3–4	Shirebrook Miners Welfare
88	Holbeach United	3–2	St Neots Town
96	Ilkeston Town	2–1	Tamworth
101	Maidstone United	2–3	Tunbridge Wells United
104	Frome Town	1–2	Warminster Town
106	Oswestry Town	3–1	Wellington Town
116	Leyton	1–0	Woodford Town

=== 2nd replay ===
Tie	Home team	Score	Away team
80	Scarborough	1–0	Ashington

== 2nd qualifying round ==
=== Ties ===
Tie	Home team	Score	Away team
1	Altrincham	3–2	Mossley
2	Annfield Plain	4–1	Bedlington Mechanics
3	Arundel	2–5	Hastings United
4	Ashford Town (Kent)	1–0	Folkestone
5	Atherstone Town	0–2	Ilkeston Town
6	Bangor City	4–1	Runcorn
7	Barnstaple Town	9–1	Wadebridge Town
8	Barry Town	2–0	Llanelli
9	Basingstoke Town	4–1	Fareham Town
10	Belper Town	3–2	Norton Woodseats
11	Betteshanger Colliery Welfare	6–0	Canterbury City
12	Bideford	6–2	Truro City
13	Biggleswade & District	1–2	Letchworth Town
14	Bilston	5–1	Rugby Town
15	Bishop's Stortford	0–1	Hertford Town
16	Brigg Town	0–3	Skegness Town
17	Bromsgrove Rovers	4–0	Stourbridge
18	Brush Sports	4–3	Nuneaton Borough
19	Bungay Town	1–0	Gorleston
20	Burscough	4–1	Netherfield
21	Bury Town	6–5	Clacton Town
22	Buxton	1–2	Witton Albion
23	Calne & Harris United	7–2	Devizes Town
24	Cambridge City	5–1	March Town United
25	Cambridge United	3–0	Holbeach United
26	Cheltenham Town	2–2	Merthyr Tydfil
27	Clitheroe	6–3	Penrith
28	Cowes	3–0	Andover
29	Crawley Town	2–2	Eastbourne
30	Creswell Colliery	2–5	Heanor Town
31	Dartford	0–2	Tunbridge Wells United
32	Denaby United	2–0	Farsley Celtic
33	Earlestown	0–1	Prescot Cables
34	Easington Colliery Welfare	0–2	Boldon Colliery Welfare
35	Enfield	15–0	Hoddesdon Town
36	Evesham United	3–1	Hednesford Town
37	Ferryhill Athletic	2–4	Consett
38	Frickley Colliery	1–3	Goole Town
39	Gainsborough Trinity	4–1	Bourne Town
40	Gravesend & Northfleet	4–3	Bexleyheath & Welling
41	Grays Athletic	2–2	Ilford
42	Great Yarmouth Town	6–2	Lowestoft Town
43	Harwich & Parkeston	5–2	Sudbury Town
44	Hayes	1–0	Hounslow Town
45	Hendon	0–2	Hornchurch & Upminster
46	Ilminster Town	1–3	Bridgwater Town
47	Kidderminster Harriers	0–2	Oswestry Town
48	Kingstonian	0–3	Woking
49	Leytonstone	1–3	Leyton
50	Lytham	2–1	Bacup Borough
51	Maidenhead United	5–0	Wokingham Town
52	Matlock Town	3–1	Worksop Town
53	Murton Colliery Welfare	2–5	Scarborough
54	North Shields	5–0	Newburn
55	Northwich Victoria	0–3	Ellesmere Port Town
56	Oxford City	5–1	Banbury Spencer
57	Poole Town	4–0	Bridport
58	Shildon	4–0	Redcar Albion
59	South Normanton Miners Welfare	6–1	Shirebrook Miners Welfare
60	Southall	1–1	Yiewsley
61	Spalding United	1–2	Corby Town
62	Spennymoor United	3–1	South Bank
63	Stockton	4–2	Stanley United
64	Taunton	0–0	Glastonbury
65	Tow Law Town	4–4	West Auckland Town
66	Walthamstow Avenue	4–0	Finchley
67	Warminster Town	0–5	Salisbury
68	Wellingborough Town	0–2	Rushden Town
69	Westbury United	1–3	Trowbridge Town
70	Willington	4–1	Whitley Bay
71	Wimbledon	0–1	Sutton United
72	Wolverton Town & B R	5–1	Vauxhall Motors

=== Replays ===
Tie	Home team	Score	Away team
26	Merthyr Tydfil	0–1	Cheltenham Town
29	Eastbourne	1–2	Crawley Town
41	Ilford	2–4	Grays Athletic
60	Yiewsley	1–2	Southall
64	Glastonbury	2–1	Taunton
65	West Auckland Town	5–2	Tow Law Town

== 3rd qualifying round ==
=== Ties ===
Tie	Home team	Score	Away team
1	Annfield Plain	2–3	Scarborough
2	Ashford Town (Kent)	3–0	Betteshanger Colliery Welfare
3	Barnstaple Town	1–1	Bideford
4	Barry Town	1–4	Cheltenham Town
5	Basingstoke Town	2–1	Cowes
6	Belper Town	2–3	Matlock Town
7	Boldon Colliery Welfare	0–4	Consett
8	Bridgwater Town	3–1	Glastonbury
9	Bungay Town	1–4	Great Yarmouth Town
10	Bury Town	2–0	Harwich & Parkeston
11	Calne & Harris United	1–6	Trowbridge Town
12	Cambridge United	0–1	Cambridge City
13	Clitheroe	1–2	Burscough
14	Corby Town	2–2	Rushden Town
15	Crawley Town	2–2	Hastings United
16	Ellesmere Port Town	4–1	Witton Albion
17	Evesham United	2–1	Bilston
18	Goole Town	0–1	Denaby United
19	Heanor Town	2–1	South Normanton Miners Welfare
20	Hertford Town	2–3	Enfield
21	Ilkeston Town	1–1	Brush Sports
22	Letchworth Town	3–2	Wolverton Town & B R
23	Leyton	1–1	Grays Athletic
24	Lytham	1–1	Altrincham
25	Oswestry Town	3–1	Bromsgrove Rovers
26	Oxford City	3–0	Maidenhead United
27	Poole Town	0–1	Salisbury
28	Prescot Cables	4–1	Bangor City
29	Shildon	2–0	North Shields
30	Skegness Town	0–0	Gainsborough Trinity
31	Southall	1–1	Hayes
32	Stockton	1–1	Spennymoor United
33	Sutton United	3–3	Woking
34	Tunbridge Wells United	0–3	Gravesend & Northfleet
35	Walthamstow Avenue	7–1	Hornchurch & Upminster
36	Willington	0–2	West Auckland Town

=== Replays ===
Tie	Home team	Score	Away team
3	Bideford	1–5	Barnstaple Town
14	Rushden Town	2–1	Corby Town
15	Hastings United	5–2	Crawley Town
21	Brush Sports	1–2	Ilkeston Town
23	Grays Athletic	6–2	Leyton
24	Altrincham	3–0	Lytham
30	Gainsborough Trinity	3–0	Skegness Town
31	Hayes	4–1	Southall
32	Spennymoor United	1–0	Stockton
33	Woking	1–3	Sutton United

== 4th qualifying round ==
The teams that given byes to this round are Bishop Auckland, Wycombe Wanderers, Bedford Town, Peterborough United, Wigan Athletic, Yeovil Town, Hereford United, South Shields, Worcester City, Headington United, King's Lynn, Weymouth, Rhyl, Blyth Spartans, Guildford City, Dorchester Town, Margate, Chelmsford City, Bath City, Durham City, Kettering Town, Boston United, Wisbech Town and Tooting & Mitcham United.

=== Ties ===
Tie	Home team	Score	Away team
1	Barnstaple Town	1–0	Trowbridge Town
2	Bedford Town	5–3	Hayes
3	Bishop Auckland	1–2	Scarborough
4	Blyth Spartans	4–0	Spennymoor United
5	Cambridge City	2–3	Headington United
6	Cheltenham Town	0–0	Bridgwater Town
7	Consett	0–0	South Shields
8	Ellesmere Port Town	1–2	Burscough
9	Enfield	3–0	Rushden Town
10	Gainsborough Trinity	4–2	Heanor Town
11	Gravesend & Northfleet	1–2	Ashford Town (Kent)
12	Grays Athletic	1–3	Chelmsford City
13	Ilkeston Town	2–6	Matlock Town
14	Kettering Town	1–0	Boston United
15	Letchworth Town	3–4	King's Lynn
16	Margate	1–0	Guildford City
17	Oswestry Town	4–1	Evesham United
18	Peterborough United	8–1	Bury Town
19	Prescot Cables	1–0	Altrincham
20	Salisbury	2–2	Basingstoke Town
21	Shildon	6–1	Denaby United
22	Sutton United	2–3	Hastings United
23	Tooting & Mitcham United	1–2	Wisbech Town
24	Walthamstow Avenue	2–1	Great Yarmouth Town
25	West Auckland Town	2–2	Durham City
26	Weymouth	0–1	Dorchester Town
27	Wigan Athletic	1–1	Rhyl
28	Worcester City	0–3	Hereford United
29	Wycombe Wanderers	1–0	Oxford City
30	Yeovil Town	0–2	Bath City

=== Replays ===
Tie	Home team	Score	Away team
6	Bridgwater Town	0–1	Cheltenham Town
7	South Shields	2–2	Consett
20	Basingstoke Town	0–1	Salisbury
25	Durham City	0–0	West Auckland Town
27	Rhyl	3–1	Wigan Athletic

=== 2nd replays ===
Tie	Home team	Score	Away team
7	Consett	5–5	South Shields
25	West Auckland Town	4–1	Durham City

=== 3rd replay ===
Tie	Home team	Score	Away team
7	South Shields	1–0	Consett

== 1959–60 FA Cup ==
See 1959-60 FA Cup for details of the rounds from the first round proper onwards.
