= 1958–59 FA Cup qualifying rounds =

Tournament details
- Country: England; Wales

The FA Cup 1958–59 is the 78th season of the world's oldest football knockout competition; The Football Association Challenge Cup, or FA Cup for short. The large number of clubs entering the tournament from lower down the English football league system meant that the competition started with a number of preliminary and qualifying rounds. The 30 victorious teams from the fourth round qualifying progressed to the first round proper.

== Preliminary round ==
=== Ties ===
Tie	Home team	Score	Away team
1	Abingdon Town	0–2	Maidenhead United
2	Ashford Town (Kent)	10–1	Betteshanger Colliery Welfare
3	Ashton United	4–1	Leyland Motors
4	Aveley	0–1	Barking
5	Aylesbury United	2–2	Wokingham Town
6	Bacup Borough	4–1	Droylsden
7	Banbury Spencer	0–3	Oxford City
8	Barry Town	2–0	Cheltenham Town
9	Beighton Miners Welfare	2–5	Belper Town
10	Bexhill Town	2–3	Arundel
11	Bilston	6–1	Lockheed Leamington
12	Bognor Regis Town	5–1	Littlehampton Town
13	Boston United	3–0	Alford United
14	Briggs Sports	2–2	Clapton
15	Burton Albion	3–2	Atherstone Town
16	Chesham United	3–0	Huntley & Palmers
17	Cheshunt	3–2	Bishop's Stortford
18	Chorley	1–0	Mossley
19	Clacton Town	0–1	Harwich & Parkeston
20	Crawley Town	0–1	Horsham
21	Cromptons Recreation	1–4	Horwich R M I
22	Darlaston	1–3	Evesham United
23	Dorking	2–1	Wimbledon
24	Dulwich Hamlet	5–2	Epsom
25	Eastbourne	1–1	Haywards Heath
26	Ely City	3–5	Holbeach United
27	Erith & Belvedere	8–0	Chatham Town
28	Fareham Town	4–2	Ryde Sports
29	Flint Town United	4–3	Marine
30	Halesowen Town	2–2	Bedworth Town
31	Histon	0–5	Wisbech Town
32	Hyde United	2–0	Lostock Gralam
33	Kingstonian	1–5	Carshalton Athletic
34	Linotype & Machinery	1–2	Witton Albion
35	Llandudno	7–0	Stork
36	Lye Town	1–0	Bourneville Athletic
37	Macclesfield	1–3	Ellesmere Port Town
38	March Town United	5–2	Chatteris Town
39	Minehead	3–4	Bideford
40	Moor Green	5–3	Cradley Heath
41	Prescot Cables	4–3	Earlestown
42	Redhill	3–2	Walton & Hersham
43	Rossendale United	1–0	Lytham
44	Runcorn	7–1	South Liverpool
45	Soham Town Rangers	4–1	Warboys Town
46	Southwick	3–1	Lancing Athletic
47	Stafford Rangers	11–0	Dudley Town
48	Staines Town	2–2	Harrow Town
49	Stalybridge Celtic	1–1	Winsford United
50	Tunbridge Wells United	3–1	Maidstone United
51	Wadebridge Town	4–1	Penzance
52	Ware	2–2	Hemel Hempstead
53	Windsor & Eton	4–3	Marlow

=== Replays ===
Tie	Home team	Score	Away team
5	Wokingham Town	4–2	Aylesbury United
14	Clapton	1–3	Briggs Sports
25	Haywards Heath	3–1	Eastbourne
30	Bedworth Town	4–2	Halesowen Town
48	Harrow Town	2–3	Staines Town
49	Winsford United	5–1	Stalybridge Celtic
52	Hemel Hempstead	1–0	Ware

== 1st qualifying round ==
=== Ties ===
Tie	Home team	Score	Away team
1	Alnwick Town	3–3	Cockfield
2	Andover	4–1	Winchester City
3	Annfield Plain	1–1	Whitley Bay
4	Arundel	3–2	Newhaven
5	Ashford Town (Kent)	6–0	Snowdown Colliery Welfare
6	Ashton United	1–3	Skelmersdale United
7	Bacup Borough	2–3	Nelson
8	Bangor City	0–0	New Brighton
9	Barking	3–1	Tilbury
10	Barnet	1–2	St Albans City
11	Barnstaple Town	3–0	Truro City
12	Barry Town	1–4	Merthyr Tydfil
13	Basingstoke Town	2–2	Alton Town
14	Bedworth Town	1–1	Sutton Coldfield Town
15	Belper Town	2–3	Sheffield
16	Berkhamsted Town	2–2	Hemel Hempstead
17	Bexleyheath & Welling	1–1	Tonbridge
18	Bideford	3–0	Tavistock
19	Biggleswade & District	1–2	Vauxhall Motors
20	Billingham Synthonia	2–4	Tow Law Town
21	Bilston	2–1	Rugby Town
22	Bognor Regis Town	0–2	Haywards Heath
23	Boldmere St Michaels	2–4	Evesham United
24	Boston United	5–2	Louth United
25	Bourne Town	1–2	Skegness Town
26	Bridgwater Town	2–0	Street
27	Bridlington Central United	2–3	Chilton Athletic
28	Bridport	2–5	Salisbury
29	Brigg Town	3–1	Ashby Institute
30	Briggs Sports	4–4	Hornchurch & Upminster
31	Bromley	2–2	Tooting & Mitcham United
32	Bromsgrove Rovers	4–2	Lye Town
33	Bungay Town	4–3	Sheringham
34	Burscough	2–2	Netherfield
35	Burton Albion	0–3	Nuneaton Borough
36	Calne & Harris United	2–7	Trowbridge Town
37	Cambridge United	2–1	Cambridge City
38	Carshalton Athletic	5–0	Metropolitan Police
39	Cheshunt	4–0	Hoddesdon Town
40	Chorley	2–1	Horwich R M I
41	Clandown	1–3	Taunton
42	Clay Cross & Danesmoor Welfare	2–3	South Normanton Miners Welfare
43	Congleton Town	1–5	Buxton
44	Consett	2–1	Whitby Town
45	Corby Town	7–2	Stamford
46	Cowes	5–4	Chichester City
47	Creswell Colliery	0–3	Sutton Town
48	Dartford	3–3	Tunbridge Wells United
49	Darwen	3–1	Rossendale United
50	Deal Town	3–4	Whitstable
51	Denaby United	4–2	Yorkshire Amateur
52	Devizes Town	2–6	Chippenham Town
53	Dorking	1–4	Sutton United
54	Dover	0–2	Canterbury City
55	East End Park W M C	1–0	Upton Colliery
56	Eastbourne United	3–1	Southwick
57	Edgware Town	0–4	Dagenham
58	Ellesmere Port Town	3–1	Northwich Victoria
59	Erith & Belvedere	0–4	Sittingbourne
60	Eton Manor	2–9	Romford
61	Evenwood Town	8–1	Easington Colliery Welfare
62	Eynesbury Rovers	3–0	Wolverton Town & B R
63	Fareham Town	6–2	Gosport Borough Athletic
64	Farsley Celtic	1–3	Selby Town
65	Ferryhill Athletic	1–1	Morpeth Town
66	Fleetwood	6–2	Clitheroe
67	Glastonbury	0–0	Clevedon
68	Gloucester City	3–2	Cinderford Town
69	Gorleston	3–2	Diss Town
70	Grantham	1–4	Gainsborough Trinity
71	Grays Athletic	0–1	Woodford Town
72	Great Yarmouth Town	4–4	Thetford Town
73	Gresley Rovers	1–3	Tamworth
74	Hallam	3–1	Boots Athletic
75	Harwich & Parkeston	1–1	Sudbury Town
76	Headington United	7–0	Windsor & Eton
77	Hednesford Town	0–6	Brierley Hill Alliance
78	Hendon	3–2	Finchley
79	Hertford Town	0–2	Enfield
80	Hinckley Athletic	1–2	Brush Sports
81	Hitchin Town	6–2	Dunstable Town
82	Horsham	5–2	Worthing
83	Hounslow Town	0–2	Yiewsley
84	Ilfracombe Town	4–4	Wadebridge Town
85	Leiston	2–6	Whitton United
86	Leyton	2–2	Brentwood & Warley
87	Llandudno	3–0	St Helens Town
88	Long Eaton United	2–0	Ilkeston Town
89	Long Melford	2–2	Haverhill Rovers
90	Lovells Athletic	1–1	Llanelli
91	Lowestoft Town	0–1	King's Lynn
92	Maidenhead United	7–2	Witney Town
93	March Town United	0–1	St Neots Town
94	Melksham Town	1–6	Chippenham United
95	Milnthorpe Corinthians	2–0	Penrith
96	Moor Green	0–8	Wellington Town
97	Morecambe	5–2	Lancaster City
98	Norton Woodseats	4–1	Matlock Town
99	Oswestry Town	5–3	Kidderminster Harriers
100	Oxford City	5–2	Chesham United
101	Players Athletic	0–4	Worksop Town
102	Poole Town	7–1	Frome Town
103	Portland United	7–0	Ilminster Town
104	Prescot Cables	8–0	Pwllheli & District
105	Rainham Town	2–1	Leytonstone
106	Ramsgate Athletic	3–2	Folkestone
107	Ransome & Marles	1–5	Heanor Town
108	Redhill	1–0	Dulwich Hamlet
109	Runcorn	0–1	Flint Town United
110	Rushden Town	5–2	Rothwell Town
111	Sheppey United	2–6	Gravesend & Northfleet
112	Shildon	2–6	Horden Colliery Welfare
113	Shirebrook Miners Welfare	0–1	Retford Town
114	Soham Town Rangers	1–3	Holbeach United
115	South Bank	0–1	West Auckland Town
116	Southall	0–2	Hayes
117	Spalding United	4–6	Kettering Town
118	St Blazey	2–1	Newquay
119	Stafford Rangers	4–1	Stourbridge
120	Staines Town	3–6	Wembley
121	Stevenage Town	3–2	Letchworth Town
122	Stocksbridge Works	3–3	Frickley Colliery
123	Stockton	4–5	Spennymoor United
124	Stonehouse	1–0	Ebbw Vale
125	Stowmarket	3–1	Newmarket Town
126	Wealdstone	2–1	Uxbridge
127	Weston Super Mare	2–1	Wells City
128	Willington	6–0	Shotton Colliery Welfare
129	Winsford United	1–2	Hyde United
130	Wisbech Town	7–0	Somersham Town
131	Witton Albion	1–2	Stockton Heath
132	Wokingham Town	3–2	Slough Town

=== Replays ===
Tie	Home team	Score	Away team
1	Cockfield	3–2	Alnwick Town
3	Whitley Bay	2–1	Annfield Plain
8	New Brighton	3–2	Bangor City
13	Alton Town	3–2	Basingstoke Town
14	Sutton Coldfield Town	2–3	Bedworth Town
16	Hemel Hempstead	1–2	Berkhamsted Town
17	Tonbridge	6–5	Bexleyheath & Welling
30	Hornchurch & Upminster	3–2	Briggs Sports
31	Tooting & Mitcham United	5–1	Bromley
34	Netherfield	2–1	Burscough
48	Tunbridge Wells United	1–2	Dartford
65	Morpeth Town	0–2	Ferryhill Athletic
67	Clevedon	0–2	Glastonbury
72	Thetford Town	3–3	Great Yarmouth Town
75	Sudbury Town	0–2	Harwich & Parkeston
84	Wadebridge Town	2–1	Ilfracombe Town
86	Brentwood & Warley	2–1	Leyton
89	Haverhill Rovers	4–2	Long Melford
90	Llanelli	1–1	Lovells Athletic
122	Frickley Colliery	0–3	Stocksbridge Works

=== 2nd replay ===
Tie	Home team	Score	Away team
72	Thetford Town	4–5	Great Yarmouth Town
90	Lovells Athletic	3–2	Llanelli

== 2nd qualifying round ==
=== Ties ===
Tie	Home team	Score	Away team
1	Andover	1–0	Fareham Town
2	Barnstaple Town	0–2	Bideford
3	Bedworth Town	0–1	Bilston
4	Brierley Hill Alliance	4–0	Evesham United
5	Buxton	3–0	Hyde United
6	Cambridge United	1–2	Holbeach United
7	Chippenham Town	3–0	Westbury United
8	Chippenham United	1–2	Trowbridge Town
9	Cockfield	1–2	Blackhall Colliery Welfare
10	Consett	3–2	Ashington
11	Cowes	1–2	Alton Town
12	Cramlington Welfare	3–4	Whitley Bay
13	Darwen	1–1	Chorley
14	Denaby United	2–0	East End Park W M C
15	Eastbourne United	3–1	Haywards Heath
16	Enfield	6–0	Berkhamsted Town
17	Evenwood Town	7–2	Newburn
18	Eynesbury Rovers	0–3	Vauxhall Motors
19	Gainsborough Trinity	6–2	Brigg Town
20	Glastonbury	1–1	Taunton
21	Gravesend & Northfleet	1–1	Dartford
22	Great Yarmouth Town	2–1	Bungay Town
23	Headington United	3–2	Oxford City
24	Hendon	3–1	Dagenham
25	Horsham	5–1	Arundel
26	Kettering Town	5–1	Corby Town
27	King's Lynn	6–1	Gorleston
28	Llandudno	5–4	Prescot Cables
29	Long Eaton United	1–2	Brush Sports
30	Lovells Athletic	2–3	Gloucester City
31	Maidenhead United	4–0	Wokingham Town
32	Milnthorpe Corinthians	1–2	Netherfield
33	Morecambe	4–2	Fleetwood
34	New Brighton	3–0	Flint Town United
35	North Shields	4–1	Horden Colliery Welfare
36	Norton Woodseats	4–1	Hallam
37	Oswestry Town	3–0	Bromsgrove Rovers
38	Poole Town	2–1	Salisbury
39	Portland United	3–0	Warminster Town
40	Rainham Town	3–1	Brentwood & Warley
41	Ramsgate Athletic	0–2	Canterbury City
42	Retford Town	1–1	Heanor Town
43	Romford	2–3	Hornchurch & Upminster
44	Rushden Town	1–0	Wellingborough Town
45	Skegness Town	0–3	Boston United
46	Skelmersdale United	2–0	Nelson
47	South Normanton Miners Welfare	1–4	Sheffield
48	Spennymoor United	3–3	Ferryhill Athletic
49	St Albans City	2–3	Cheshunt
50	St Blazey	2–2	Wadebridge Town
51	Stanley United	4–2	Chilton Athletic
52	Stevenage Town	3–4	Hitchin Town
53	Stocksbridge Works	1–1	Selby Town
54	Stockton Heath	0–2	Ellesmere Port Town
55	Stonehouse	2–3	Merthyr Tydfil
56	Stowmarket	5–1	Haverhill Rovers
57	Sutton United	1–1	Carshalton Athletic
58	Tamworth	1–1	Nuneaton Borough
59	Tonbridge	0–2	Sittingbourne
60	Tooting & Mitcham United	7–1	Redhill
61	Tow Law Town	4–1	Boldon Colliery Welfare
62	Wealdstone	2–1	Hayes
63	Wellington Town	3–1	Stafford Rangers
64	West Auckland Town	3–0	Redcar Albion
65	Weston Super Mare	1–3	Bridgwater Town
66	Whitstable	1–2	Ashford Town (Kent)
67	Whitton United	0–2	Harwich & Parkeston
68	Wisbech Town	4–0	St Neots Town
69	Wolsingham Welfare	1–4	Willington
70	Woodford Town	2–1	Barking
71	Worksop Town	3–3	Sutton Town
72	Yiewsley	3–1	Wembley

=== Replays ===
Tie	Home team	Score	Away team
13	Chorley	3–0	Darwen
20	Taunton	4–0	Glastonbury
21	Dartford	2–4	Gravesend & Northfleet
42	Heanor Town	7–1	Retford Town
48	Ferryhill Athletic	2–1	Spennymoor United
50	Wadebridge Town	3–1	St Blazey
53	Selby Town	1–2	Stocksbridge Works
57	Carshalton Athletic	3–4	Sutton United
58	Nuneaton Borough	1–0	Tamworth
71	Sutton Town	4–3	Worksop Town

== 3rd qualifying round ==
=== Ties ===
Tie	Home team	Score	Away team
1	Andover	3–2	Alton Town
2	Ashford Town (Kent)	1–1	Canterbury City
3	Bideford	7–1	Wadebridge Town
4	Bilston	2–2	Brierley Hill Alliance
5	Blackhall Colliery Welfare	2–2	Whitley Bay
6	Boston United	1–1	Gainsborough Trinity
7	Bridgwater Town	1–2	Taunton
8	Cheshunt	3–1	Enfield
9	Chippenham Town	2–2	Trowbridge Town
10	Consett	0–0	Willington
11	Denaby United	2–1	Stocksbridge Works
12	Ellesmere Port Town	2–2	Buxton
13	Evenwood Town	1–0	North Shields
14	Great Yarmouth Town	0–1	King's Lynn
15	Harwich & Parkeston	1–0	Stowmarket
16	Hornchurch & Upminster	0–1	Hendon
17	Horsham	3–1	Eastbourne United
18	Llandudno	0–1	New Brighton
19	Maidenhead United	1–6	Headington United
20	Merthyr Tydfil	2–1	Gloucester City
21	Netherfield	0–0	Morecambe
22	Nuneaton Borough	2–1	Brush Sports
23	Portland United	1–0	Poole Town
24	Rushden Town	0–1	Kettering Town
25	Sheffield	2–0	Norton Woodseats
26	Sittingbourne	4–4	Gravesend & Northfleet
27	Skelmersdale United	2–2	Chorley
28	Sutton Town	1–3	Heanor Town
29	Sutton United	1–8	Tooting & Mitcham United
30	Tow Law Town	2–0	Ferryhill Athletic
31	Vauxhall Motors	0–2	Hitchin Town
32	Wellington Town	2–3	Oswestry Town
33	West Auckland Town	3–3	Stanley United
34	Wisbech Town	4–0	Holbeach United
35	Woodford Town	2–0	Rainham Town
36	Yiewsley	1–2	Wealdstone

=== Replays ===
Tie	Home team	Score	Away team
2	Canterbury City	2–4	Ashford Town (Kent)
4	Brierley Hill Alliance	4–2	Bilston
5	Whitley Bay	5–0	Blackhall Colliery Welfare
6	Gainsborough Trinity	2–2	Boston United
9	Trowbridge Town	3–0	Chippenham Town
10	Willington	1–2	Consett
12	Buxton	4–1	Ellesmere Port Town
21	Morecambe	7–1	Netherfield
26	Gravesend & Northfleet	2–0	Sittingbourne
27	Chorley	3–0	Skelmersdale United
33	Stanley United	2–0	West Auckland Town

=== 2nd replay ===
Tie	Home team	Score	Away team
6	Gainsborough Trinity	1–3	Boston United

== 4th qualifying round ==
The teams that given byes to this round are Bishop Auckland, Wycombe Wanderers, Bedford Town, Peterborough United, Wigan Athletic, Yeovil Town, Hereford United, South Shields, Walthamstow Avenue, Weymouth, Rhyl, Blyth Spartans, Hastings United, Guildford City, Newport I O W, Scarborough, Dorchester Town, Goole Town, Margate, Chelmsford City, Worcester City, Bath City, Crook Town and Durham City.

=== Ties ===
Tie	Home team	Score	Away team
1	Bath City	3–1	Trowbridge Town
2	Bedford Town	3–4	Wisbech Town
3	Bideford	1–4	Yeovil Town
4	Bishop Auckland	4–1	Stanley United
5	Blyth Spartans	1–0	Durham City
6	Buxton	4–0	New Brighton
7	Chelmsford City	2–0	Harwich & Parkeston
8	Cheshunt	0–6	King's Lynn
9	Consett	3–0	Whitley Bay
10	Crook Town	3–0	Evenwood Town
11	Goole Town	1–2	Denaby United
12	Gravesend & Northfleet	0–0	Margate
13	Guildford City	1–0	Andover
14	Hastings United	1–1	Ashford Town (Kent)
15	Heanor Town	2–2	Scarborough
16	Hendon	1–3	Wycombe Wanderers
17	Hitchin Town	1–1	Woodford Town
18	Merthyr Tydfil	2–1	Taunton
19	Morecambe	2–0	Chorley
20	Nuneaton Borough	2–2	Hereford United
21	Oswestry Town	1–3	Kettering Town
22	Peterborough United	3–0	Walthamstow Avenue
23	Portland United	2–2	Newport I O W
24	Rhyl	1–0	Wigan Athletic
25	Sheffield	0–3	Boston United
26	Tooting & Mitcham United	4–0	Horsham
27	Tow Law Town	2–3	South Shields
28	Wealdstone	2–4	Headington United
29	Weymouth	3–0	Dorchester Town
30	Worcester City	3–0	Brierley Hill Alliance

=== Replays ===
Tie	Home team	Score	Away team
12	Margate	4–3	Gravesend & Northfleet
14	Ashford Town (Kent)	2–1	Hastings United
15	Scarborough	2–3	Heanor Town
17	Woodford Town	2–3	Hitchin Town
20	Hereford United	3–1	Nuneaton Borough
23	Newport I O W	3–1	Portland United

== 1958–59 FA Cup ==
See 1958-59 FA Cup for details of the rounds from the first round proper onwards.
