= List of Leamington F.C. seasons =

Leamington Football Club is a football club based in Leamington Spa, Warwickshire, England. They are currently members of the Southern League Premier Division Central and play at the New Windmill Ground near Bishop's Tachbrook.

== Early history ==
The club was established in 1933 as the works team of Lockheed Borg & Beck, gaining the nickname "the Brakes" as a result of the products manufactured by the company. They initially played in the Warwick & District League, before joining the Coventry Works League for the 1934–35 season. In 1940 the club transferred to the Leamington & District League, but returned to the Coventry Works League two years later. In 1944 they changed leagues again, becoming members of the Coventry & District League. In 1947 the club was renamed Lockheed Leamington when they joined the Central Amateur League. After two third-place finishes the club joined the Birmingham Combination in 1949.

== Key ==
Key to league record

- Level = Level of the league in the current league system
- Pld = Games played
- W = Games won
- D = Games drawn
- L = Games lost
- GF = Goals for
- GA = Goals against
- GD = Goals difference
- Pts = Points
- Position = Position in the final league table
- Top scorer and number of goals scored shown in bold when he was also top scorer for the division.

Key to cup records

- Res = Final reached round
- Rec = Final club record in the form of wins-draws-losses
- PR = Preliminary round
- QR1 (2, etc.) = Qualifying Cup rounds
- G = Group stage
- R1 (2, etc.) = Proper Cup rounds
- QF = Quarter-finalists
- SF = Semi-finalists
- F = Finalists
- A(QF,SF,F) = Area quarter-, semi-, finalists
- W = Winners

== Seasons ==
Year	League														Cup competitions				Manager
Year	Division	Lvl	Pld	W	D	L	GF	GA	GD	Pts	Position	Leading league scorer		Average attendance	FA Cup		FA Trophy		Manager
Year	Division	Lvl	Pld	W	D	L	GF	GA	GD	Pts	Position	Name	Goals	Average attendance	Res	Rec	Res	Rec	Manager
As Lockheed Leamington
Joined the Birmingham Combination from the Central Amateur League.
1949–50	**Birmingham Combination**		38	10	4	24	49	96	-47	24	**19th of 20**				–				
1950–51	**Birmingham Combination**		38	17	2	19	65	67	-2	36	**9th of 20**				QR2	2–0–1			
1951–52	**Birmingham Combination**		38	16	7	15	80	71	+9	39	**9th of 20**				–				
1952–53	**Birmingham Combination**		34	10	6	18	56	68	-12	26	**15th of 18**				PR	0–0–1			
1953–54	**Birmingham Combination**		26	13	5	8	50	27	+23	31	**5th of 14**				QR1	1–0–1			
The league adsorbed into the Birmingham & District League
1954–55	**Birmingham & District League**; **Southern Division**		38	24	7	7	122	54	+68	55	**2nd of 20**				QR1	1–0–1			
1955–56	**Birmingham & District League**; **Division One**		38	21	6	11	96	50	+46	48	**4th of 20**				QR2	1–0–1			
1956–57	**Birmingham & District League**; **Division One**		38	16	10	12	84	65	+19	42	**6th of 20**				QR4	3–0–2			
1957–58	**Birmingham & District League**; **Division One**		38	17	7	14	73	52	+21	41	**7th of 20**				PR	0–0–1			
1958–59	**Birmingham & District League**; **Division One**		34	15	7	12	85	59	+26	37	**6th of 18**				PR	0–0–1			
1959–60	**Birmingham & District League**; **Division One**		34	15	3	16	59	58	+1	33	**11th of 18**				PR	0–0–1			
1960–61	**Birmingham & District League**		42	29	4	9	125	46	+79	62	**3rd of 22**				QR4	3–0–1			Sid Ottewell
1961–62	**Birmingham & District League**		40	31	5	4	124	37	+87	67	**1st of 21**				QR1	0–0–1			Sid Ottewell
The league changed name.
1962–63	**West Midlands (Regional) League**		38	28	7	3	119	40	+79	63	**1st of 20**				QR2	0–0–1			Sid Ottewell
1963–64	**Midland Football League**		42	23	8	11	114	60	+54	54	**3rd of 22**				QR4	3–3–1			Sid Ottewell
1964–65	**Midland Football League**		42	28	9	5	113	59	+54	65	**1st of 22**				QR3	2–0–1			Sid Ottewell
1965–66	**Midland Football League**		42	21	12	9	126	81	+45	54	**5th of 22**				QR2	1–0–1			Sid Ottewell
1966–67	**Midland Football League**		42	23	6	13	105	80	+25	52	**5th of 22**				QR1	0–0–1			Sid Ottewell
1967–68	**Midland Football League**		40	16	6	18	66	69	-3	38	**13th of 21**				QR1	0–0–1			Sid Ottewell
1968–69	**Midland Football League**		34	12	8	14	53	64	-11	32	**10th of 18**				PR	0–1–1			Sid Ottewell
1969–70	**Midland Football League**		34	16	4	14	65	59	+6	36	**9th of 18**				PR	0–0–1	QR2	1-1-1	Geoff Coleman
1970–71	**Midland Football League**		34	18	6	10	64	41	+23	42	**6th of 18**				PR	0–0–1	QR2	1-1-1	Geoff Coleman
The Southern Football League expanded Division One up to two sections, the club joined Division One North.
1971–72	**Southern Football League**; **Division One North**	6	34	15	3	16	41	52	-11	33	**13th of 18**				QR2	1–0–1	QR3	1-2-1	Geoff Coleman
1972–73	**Southern Football League**; **Division One North**	6	42	13	12	17	51	58	-7	38	**15th of 22**				QR1	0–0–1	QR1	0-0-1	Geoff Coleman
The club renamed A P Leamington.
1973–74	**Southern Football League**; **Division One North**	6	42	21	12	9	82	45	+37	54	**4th of 22**				QR1	1-0-1	QR2	1-2-1	
1974–75	**Southern Football League**; **Division One North**	6	42	25	7	10	68	48	+20	57	**3rd of 22**				R1	4-0-1	QR2	2-1-1	
1975–76	**Southern Football League**; **Division One North**	6	42	27	10	5	85	31	+54	64	**2nd of 22**				R1	4-0-1	QR1	1-0-1	
1976–77	**Southern Football League**; **Premier Division**	5	42	12	15	15	44	53	-9	39	**12th of 22**				QR2	2-2-1	QR3	2-0-1	
1977–78	**Southern Football League**; **Premier Division**	5	42	11	13	18	34	57	-23	35	**18th of 22**				R2	5-1-1	R2	2-1-1	
1978–79	**Southern Football League**; **Premier Division**	5	42	19	11	12	65	53	+12	49	**7th of 22**				R2	2-1-1	QR2	1-0-1	
Alliance Premier League created. The club qualified to join it.
1979–80	**Alliance Premier League**	5	38	7	11	20	32	63	-31	25	**18th of 20**				R1	1-1-1	QR2	1-0-1	
1980–81	**Alliance Premier League**	5	38	10	11	17	47	66	-19	31	**16th of 20**				QR4	0-0-1	QR1	0-0-1	
1981–82	**Alliance Premier League**	5	42	4	10	28	40	105	-65	22	**22nd of 22**				QR4	0-0-1	QR1	0-0-1	
1982–83	**Southern Football League**; **Premier Division**	6	38	25	4	9	78	50	+28	79	**1st of 20**				QR4	3-1-1	QR2	1-1-1	
1983–84	**Southern Football League**; **Premier Division**	6	38	14	9	15	73	83	-10	51	**13th of 20**				R1	4-2-1	QF	3-0-1	
1984–85	**Southern Football League**; **Premier Division**	6	38	2	5	31	22	112	-90	11	**20th of 20**				QR1	0-0-1	R1	0-0-1	
The club renamed Leamington.
1985–86	**Southern Football League**; **Midland Division**	7	40	10	6	24	40	77	-37	36	**20th of 21**				PR	0-0-1	QR3	0-0-1	
1986–87	**Southern Football League**; **Midland Division**	7	38	4	13	21	37	80	-43	25	**19th of 20**				QR1	1-1-1	QR1	0-0-1	
1986–87	**Southern Football League**; **Midland Division**	7	Resigned from the league												QR1	1-1-1	QR1	0-0-1	
1987–88	**Midland Football Combination**	8	36	8	11	17	37	59	-22	27	**15th of 19**				QR2	1-0-1	QR2	1-0-1	
The club resigned form the league and didn't join any till 2000.
2000–01	**Midland Football Combination**; **Division Two**	11	34	28	4	2	96	31	+65	88	**1st of 18**				–		–		Jason Cadden & Barry Proctor
2001–02	**Midland Football Combination**; **Division One**	10	36	28	6	2	107	30	+77	90	**2nd of 19**				–		–		Jason Cadden & Barry Proctor
2002–03	**Midland Football Combination**; **Premier Division**	9	42	27	9	6	92	48	+44	90	**3rd of 22**				–		–		Jason Cadden & Barry Proctor
2003–04	**Midland Football Combination**; **Premier Division**	9	40	30	4	6	101	36	+65	94	**2nd of 21**				–		–		Jason Cadden
2003–04	**Midland Football Combination**; **Premier Division**	9	Level of the league decreased after the Conference North and South creation.												–		–		Jason Cadden
2004–05	**Midland Football Combination**; **Premier Division**	10	42	35	4	3	132	40	+92	109	**1st of 22**				–		–		Jason Cadden
2005–06	**Midland Football Alliance**	9	42	21	11	10	79	44	+35	74	**5th of 22**				R1	3-4-1	–		Jason Cadden
2006–07	**Midland Football Alliance**	9	42	33	4	5	105	36	+69	103	**1st of 22**				QR1	1-0-1	–		Jason Cadden
2007–08	**Southern Football League**; **Division One Midlands**	8	40	27	8	5	74	27	+47	89	**2nd of 21**			576	QR1	1-0-1	R1	4-1-1	Jason Cadden
2008–09	**Southern Football League**; **Division One Midlands**	8	42	32	5	5	114	44	+70	101	**1st of 22**			666	QR1	1-0-1	QR1	00-1	Jason Cadden
2009–10	**Southern Football League**; **Premier Division**	7	42	19	8	15	84	75	+9	65	**10th of 22**			636	QR1	0-0-1	QR1	0-0-1	Jason Cadden; Paul Holleran
2010–11	**Southern Football League**; **Premier Division**	7	40	24	6	10	68	39	+29	78	**5th of 21**			525	QR1	0-1-1	QR3	2-0-1	Paul Holleran
2010–11	**Southern Football League**; **Premier Division**	7	Lost in the **play-off** semifinal												QR1	0-1-1	QR3	2-0-1	Paul Holleran
2011–12	**Southern Football League**; **Premier Division**	7	42	18	15	9	60	47	+13	69	**7th of 22**			505	QR2	1-0-1	QR1	0-0-1	Paul Holleran
2012–13	**Southern Football League**; **Premier Division**	7	42	30	5	7	85	46	+39	95	**1st of 22**			546	QR2	1-1-1	QR1	0-2-0	Paul Holleran
2013–14	**Conference North**	6	42	13	13	16	54	53	+1	52	**13th of 22**	Stefan Moore	11	624	QR2	0-1-1	R2	2-1-1	Paul Holleran
2014–15	**Conference North**	6	42	10	10	22	59	74	-15	40	**21st of 22**	Danny Newton	16	545	QR3	1-1-1	QR3	0-0-1	Paul Holleran
2015–16	**Southern Football League**; **Premier Division**	7	46	23	12	11	59	38	+21	81	**5th of 24**			426	QR1	0-1-1	R1	3-2-1	Paul Holleran
2015–16	**Southern Football League**; **Premier Division**	7	Lost in the **play-off** final												QR1	0-1-1	R1	3-2-1	Paul Holleran
2016–17	**Southern Football League**; **Premier Division**	7	46	27	11	8	74	32	+42	92	**2nd of 24**			488	QR1	0-0-1	QR1	0-0-1	Paul Holleran
2016–17	**Southern Football League**; **Premier Division**	7	Promoted after winning the **play-off**												QR1	0-0-1	QR1	0-0-1	Paul Holleran
2017–18	**National League North**	6	42	13	10	19	51	64	-14	49	**19th of 22**	Colby Bishop	7	650	QR3	1-1-1	R1	1-0-1	Paul Holleran
2018–19	**National League North**	6	42	13	15	14	57	60	-3	54	**13th of 22**	Colby Bishop	21	667	QR2	0-0-1	R1	1-0-1	Paul Holleran
2019–20	**National League North**	6	32	9	8	15	39	51	-12	35	**18th of 22**	Josh March	16	499	QR3	1-1-1	R3	3-2-0	Paul Holleran
2019–20	**National League North**	6	The regular season was cut short due to COVID-19, final league positions decided by points-per-game												QR3	1-1-1	R3	3-2-0	Paul Holleran
2020–21	**National League North**	6	15	5	7	3	22	20	+2	22	9th of 22	Sam Osborne	8	– (Note: COVID-19 prevented fans from attending games)	QR2	0-0-1	R5	2-2-1	Paul Holleran
2020–21	**National League North**	6	The season was declared null and void due to COVID-19.												QR2	0-0-1	R5	2-2-1	Paul Holleran
2021–22	**National League North**	6	42	12	12	18	39	47	-8	48	**15th of 22**	Dan Turner	12	596	QR3	1–1–1	R2	0–0–1	Paul Holleran
2022–23	**National League North**	6	46	10	18	18	41	60	-19	48	**22nd of 24**	Dan Turner	13	650	QR2	0–0–1	R3	1–0–1	Paul Holleran
2023–24	**Southern Football League**; **Premier Division Central**	7	40	19	14	7	61	32	+29	76	**3rd of 21**	Callum Stewart	17	572	QR2	1–0–1	QR3	0–0–1	Paul Holleran
2023–24	**Southern Football League**; **Premier Division Central**	7	Promoted after winning the **play-off**												QR2	1–0–1	QR3	0–0–1	Paul Holleran
2024–25	**National League North**	6	46	15	10	21	52	56	-4	55	**16th of 24**	Callum Stewart	14	658	QR3	1–0–1	R3	1–0–1	Paul Holleran
2025–26	**National League North**	6	46	7	8	31	41	90	-49	29	**24th of 24**	Max Brogan	7	586	QR2	1–0–1	QR3	2–0–1	

== Notes ==
- Lockheed Leamington at the Football Club History Database
- A P Leamington at the Football Club History Database
- Leamington at the Football Club History Database
