= List of Alfreton Town F.C. seasons =

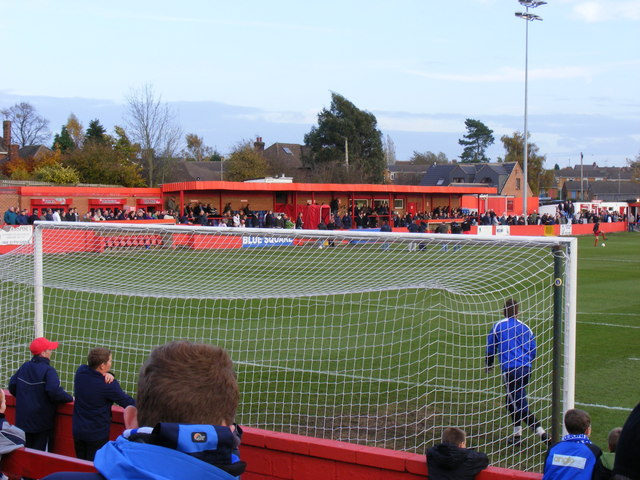
North Street, home of Alfreton Town F.C. since the club's formation in 1959

Alfreton Town Football Club is an English semi-professional association football club based in Alfreton, Derbyshire. As of the 2023–24 season they compete in the Conference North, the sixth tier of English football. The present club was formed in 1959 through the merger of Alfreton Miners Welfare and Alfreton United, though a previous incarnation of the team played for two seasons in the Midland Football League and entered the FA Cup five times between 1924 and 1929.

After the clubs re-formation they spent two seasons in Division One North of the Central Alliance before being readmitted to the Midland League. In 21 seasons Alfreton won the title three times and finished as runners-up on a further three occasions. The league merged with the Yorkshire Football League to form the Northern Counties East Football League in 1982 and it was after five seasons that Alfreton won their first ever promotion, having finished as champions in 1986–87.

In 1996 the side won promotion to the Northern Premier League Premier Division but struggled, lasting only two seasons before suffering back-to-back relegations. After three seasons back in the Northern Counties East League they achieved consecutive promotions, returning to the Northern Premier League Premier Division where they finished fourth, then the club's highest ever league finish. Founding members of the Conference North in 2004, several years of consolidation were followed by consecutive third place finishes and then the league title in 2010–11. Promotion to the Conference Premier saw the team competing in a national league competition for the first time.

Alfreton first entered the FA Cup in the 1924–25 season and have progressed to the second round proper on two occasions, in 2008–09 and 2012–13. They played in the inaugural edition of the FA Trophy and have appeared in every competition since, barring three seasons in the FA Vase after dropping to Step 5 of the National League System. Since the club's re-formation Alfreton have also taken part in the every staging of the Derbyshire Senior Cup, winning ten times and finishing as runners-up on a further eight occasions.

== Key ==
Key to league record

- Level = Level of the league in the current league system
- Pld = Games played
- W = Games won
- D = Games drawn
- L = Games lost
- GF = Goals for
- GA = Goals against
- GD = Goals difference
- Pts = Points
- Position = Position in the final league table
- Top scorer and number of goals scored shown in bold when he was also top scorer for the division.

Key to cup records

- Res = Final reached round
- Rec = Final club record in the form of wins-draws-losses
- PR = Preliminary round
- QR1 (2, etc.) = Qualifying Cup rounds
- G = Group stage
- R1 (2, etc.) = Proper Cup rounds
- QF = Quarter-finalists
- SF = Semi-finalists
- F = Finalists
- A(QF, SF, F) = Area quarter-, semi-, finalists
- W = Winners

== Seasons ==
| Year | League | | | | | | | | | | | | | | Cup competitions | | | | | Manager |
| Year | Division | Lvl | Pld | W | D | L | GF | GA | GD | Pts | Position | Leading league scorer | | Average attendance | FA Cup | | FA Trophy | | Derbyshire Cup | Manager |
| Year | Division | Lvl | Pld | W | D | L | GF | GA | GD | Pts | Position | Name | Goals | Average attendance | Res | Rec | Res | Rec | Derbyshire Cup | Manager |
|---|---|---|---|---|---|---|---|---|---|---|---|---|---|---|---|---|---|---|---|---|
| 1921–22 | **Central Alliance** | | 34 | 13 | 2 | 19 | 68 | 78 | -10 | 28 | 13th of 18 | — | — | — | — | | — | | — | |
| 1922–23 | **Central Alliance** | | 32 | 21 | 4 | 7 | 96 | 40 | +56 | 46 | 2nd of 17 | — | — | — | — | | — | | — | |
| 1923–24 | **Central Alliance** | | 26 | 18 | 5 | 3 | 95 | 31 | +64 | 41 | 1st of 14 | — | — | — | — | | — | | — | |
| 1924–25 | **Central Alliance** | | 20 | 11 | 4 | 5 | 53 | 26 | +27 | 26 | 4th of 11 | — | — | — | QR6 | — | — | | — | |
| 1925–26 | **Midland League** | | 40 | 17 | 7 | 16 | 99 | 102 | -3 | 41 | 9th of 21 | — | — | — | QR1 | — | — | | — | |
| 1926–27 | **Midland League** | | 38 | 8 | 5 | 25 | 59 | 143 | -84 | 21 | 18th of 20 | — | — | — | QR3 | — | — | | — | |
| 1927–28 | | | — | | | | | | | | | | | | QR1 | — | — | | — | |
| 1928–29 | | | — | | | | | | | | | | | | PR | — | — | | — | |
The club was re-formed through the merger of Alfreton Miners Welfare and Alfreton United in 1959.
| 1959–60 | **Central Alliance**; **One North** | | 34 | 24 | 3 | 7 | 118 | 52 | +66 | 51 | 4th of 18 | — | — | — | — | | — | | SF | |
| 1960–61 | **Central Alliance**; **One North** | | 34 | 18 | 3 | 13 | 94 | 60 | +34 | 39 | 10th of 18 | — | — | — | QR2 | 1-0-1 | — | | W (Note: Won the Derbyshire Senior Cup with a 2–1 win over Matlock Town.) | Jim Bullions |
Club was admitted into the newly re-formed Midland Football League.
| 1961–62 | **Midland Football League** | | 34 | 6 | 4 | 24 | 48 | 100 | -52 | 16 | **18th of 18** | — | — | — | QR2 | 1-0-1 | — | | R3 | Jim Bullions |
| 1962–63 | **Midland Football League** | | 38 | 18 | 14 | 6 | 83 | 50 | +33 | 50 | **5th of 20** | — | — | — | QR2 | 1-0-1 | — | | F (Note: Lost 2–1 in the Derbyshire Senior Cup final to Ilkeston Town.) | Jim Bullions |
| 1963–64 | **Midland Football League** | | 42 | 22 | 10 | 10 | 88 | 56 | +32 | 54 | **4th of 22** | — | — | — | QR1 | 0-0-1 | — | | SF | Jim Bullions |
| 1964–65 | **Midland Football League** | | 42 | 21 | 8 | 13 | 91 | 67 | +24 | 50 | **7th of 22** | — | — | — | QR1 | 0-1-1 | — | | F (Note: Lost 1–0 in the Derbyshire Senior Cup final by Long Eaton United.) | Jim Bullions |
| 1965–66 | **Midland Football League** | | 42 | 19 | 7 | 16 | 100 | 87 | +13 | 45 | **10th of 22** | — | — | — | QR1 | 0-0-1 | — | | R3 | Jim Bullions |
| 1966–67 | **Midland Football League** | | 42 | 20 | 7 | 15 | 77 | 74 | +3 | 47 | **8th of 22** | — | — | — | QR1 | 0-0-1 | — | | R3 | Jim Bullions |
| 1967–68 | **Midland Football League** | | 40 | 18 | 6 | 16 | 84 | 71 | +13 | 42 | **10th of 21** | — | — | — | QR1 | 0-0-1 | — | | SF | Jim Bullions |
| 1968–69 | **Midland Football League** | | 34 | 13 | 13 | 8 | 62 | 46 | +16 | 39 | **7th of 18** | — | — | — | QR1 | 0-0-1 | — | | R3 | Jim Bullions |
| 1969–70 | **Midland Football League** | | 34 | 30 | 3 | 1 | 119 | 19 | +100 | 63 | **1st of 18** | — | — | — | R1 | 4-4-1 | QR1 | 0-1-1 | W (Note: Won the Derbyshire Senior Cup with a 4–2 aggregate win over Gresley Rovers.) | Jim Bullions |
| 1970–71 | **Midland Football League** | | 34 | 18 | 6 | 10 | 83 | 39 | +44 | 42 | **5th of 18** | — | — | — | QR2 | 1-0-1 | QR3 | 2-0-1 | SF | Jim Bullions |
| 1971–72 | **Midland Football League** | | 34 | 22 | 5 | 7 | 85 | 39 | +46 | 49 | **2nd of 18** | — | — | — | QR3 | 2-0-1 | QR1 | 0-0-1 | SF | |
| 1972–73 | **Midland Football League** | | 34 | 17 | 10 | 7 | 80 | 44 | +36 | 44 | **4th of 18** | — | — | — | QR4 | 3-1-1 | QR3 | 2-0-1 | W (Note: Won the Derbyshire Senior Cup with a 4–1 aggregate win over Buxton.) | |
| 1973–74 | **Midland Football League** | | 32 | 22 | 5 | 5 | 77 | 37 | +40 | 49 | **1st of 18** | — | — | — | R1 | 4-2-1 | QR3 | 2-0-0 | W (Note: Won the Derbyshire Senior Cup with a 1–0 aggregate win over Matlock Town.) | |
| 1974–75 | **Midland Football League** | | 34 | 22 | 6 | 6 | 80 | 40 | +40 | 50 | **3rd of 18** | — | — | — | QR1 | 1-1-1 | QR1 | 0-0-1 | R2 | |
| 1975–76 | **Midland Football League**; **Premier Division** | | 34 | 19 | 6 | 9 | 76 | 41 | +35 | 44 | **4th of 18** | — | — | — | QR3 | 2-2-1 | QR2 | 2-3-1 | R2 | |
| 1976–77 | **Midland Football League**; **Premier Division** | | 34 | 24 | 5 | 5 | 79 | 33 | +46 | 53 | **1st of 18** | — | — | — | QR2 | 1-0-1 | PR | 0-0-1 | SF | |
| 1977–78 | **Midland Football League**; **Premier Division** | | 32 | 20 | 2 | 10 | 52 | 37 | +15 | 42 | **4th of 17** | — | — | — | QR1 | 0-0-1 | QR1 | 0-0-1 | F (Note: Lost 2–1 on aggregate in the Derbyshire Senior Cup final to Matlock Town.) | |
| 1978–79 | **Midland Football League**; **Premier Division** | | 36 | 6 | 13 | 17 | 39 | 61 | -22 | 25 | **17th of 19** | — | — | — | PR | 0-0-1 | PR | 0-0-1 | R1 | |
| 1979–80 | **Midland Football League**; **Premier Division** | | 34 | 11 | 13 | 10 | 45 | 46 | -1 | 35 | **10th of 18** | — | — | — | QR3 | 3-1-1 | QR1 | 1-1-1 | F (Note: Lost 2–1 on aggregate in the Derbyshire Senior Cup final to Belper Town.) | |
| 1980–81 | **Midland Football League**; **Premier Division** | | 34 | 16 | 10 | 8 | 73 | 40 | +33 | 42 | **2nd of 18** | — | — | — | QR3 | 2-0-1 | QR1 | 1-1-1 | SF | |
| 1981–82 | **Midland Football League**; **Premier Division** | | 34 | 20 | 7 | 7 | 64 | 24 | +40 | 47 | **2nd of 18** | — | — | — | QR2 | 2-0-1 | QR2 | 2-1-1 | W (Note: Won the Derbyshire Senior Cup with a 3–0 aggregate win over Matlock Town.) | |
Midland League merged with Yorkshire Football League and formed new Northern Counties East Football League, club qualified to join the top division.
| 1982–83 | **Northern Counties East League**; **Premier Division** | 8 | 38 | 16 | 3 | 19 | 47 | 55 | -8 | 35 | **13th of 20** | — | — | — | QR1 | 0-0-1 | PR | 0-0-1 | SF | |
| 1983–84 | **Northern Counties East League**; **Premier Division** | 8 | 34 | 18 | 6 | 10 | 56 | 32 | +24 | 42 | **4th of 18** | — | — | — | PR | 0-0-1 | QR3 | 3-1-1 | SF | |
| 1984–85 | **Northern Counties East League**; **Premier Division** | 8 | 36 | 20 | 6 | 10 | 69 | 39 | +30 | 66 | **4th of 19** | — | — | — | QR3 | 3-2-1 | QR3 | 1-3-2 | F (Note: Lost 3–1 on aggregate in the Derbyshire Senior Cup final to Matlock Town.) | |
| 1985–86 | **Northern Counties East League**; **Premier Division** | 8 | 38 | 21 | 2 | 15 | 66 | 47 | +19 | 65 | **6th of 20** | — | — | — | QR3 | 2-0-1 | QR3 | 2-1-1 | R2 | |
| 1986–87 | **Northern Counties East League**; **Premier Division** | 8 | 36 | 25 | 6 | 5 | 74 | 29 | +45 | 81 | **1st of 19**; Promoted | — | — | — | QR1 | 0-1-1 | R1 | 3-0-1 | SF | |
| 1987–88 | **Northern Premier League**; **Division One** | 7 | 36 | 13 | 8 | 15 | 53 | 54 | -1 | 47 | **11th of 19** | — | — | — | QR3 | 3-1-1 | QR3 | 2-1-1 | F (Note: Lost on penalties in the Derbyshire Senior Cup final to Matlock Town. The tie had initially finished 1–1 after two legs.) | |
| 1988–89 | **Northern Premier League**; **Division One** | 7 | 42 | 8 | 11 | 23 | 44 | 92 | -48 | 35 | **20th of 22** | — | — | — | PR | 0-0-1 | QR1 | 0-1-1 | R3 | |
| 1989–90 | **Northern Premier League**; **Division One** | 7 | 42 | 13 | 8 | 21 | 59 | 85 | -26 | 47 | **18th of 22** | — | — | — | QR2 | 2-0-1 | QR3 | 2-1-1 | R1 | |
| 1990–91 | **Northern Premier League**; **Division One** | 7 | 42 | 7 | 12 | 23 | 41 | 84 | -43 | 33 | **22nd of 22** | — | — | — | PR | 0-1-1 | QR1 | 0-0-1 | R1 | |
| 1991–92 | **Northern Premier League**; **Division One** | 7 | 42 | 12 | 2 | 28 | 63 | 98 | -35 | 38 | **20th of 22** | — | — | — | QR2 | 2-0-1 | QR2 | 1-0-1 | R3 | |
| 1992–93 | **Northern Premier League**; **Division One** | 7 | 40 | 15 | 9 | 16 | 80 | 80 | 0 | 54 | **9th of 21** | — | — | — | QR1 | 1-1-1 | QR1 | 0-0-1 | F (Note: Lost 6–5 on penalties in the Derbyshire Senior Cup final to Ilkeston Town. The tie had initially finished 1–1 after two legs.) | |
| 1993–94 | **Northern Premier League**; **Division One** | 7 | 40 | 18 | 10 | 12 | 83 | 70 | +13 | 64 | **6th of 21** | — | — | — | QR1 | 1-0-1 | R1 | 2-0-1 | SF | |
| 1994–95 | **Northern Premier League**; **Division One** | 7 | 42 | 25 | 7 | 10 | 94 | 49 | +45 | 82 | **4th of 22** | — | — | — | QR1 | 1-1-1 | QR1 | 0-0-1 | W (Note: Won the Derbyshire Senior Cup with an 8–1 aggregate victory over Ilkeston Town.) | |
| 1995–96 | **Northern Premier League**; **Division One** | 7 | 40 | 23 | 9 | 8 | 79 | 47 | +32 | 78 | **2nd of 21**; Promoted | — | — | — | PR | 0-0-1 | QR2 | 1-1-1 | R4 | |
| 1996–97 | **Northern Premier League**; **Premier Division** | 6 | 44 | 8 | 13 | 23 | 45 | 83 | -38 | 37 | **21st of 23** | — | — | — | QR1 | 0-0-1 | QR1 | 0-1-1 | R3 | |
| 1997–98 | **Northern Premier League**; **Premier Division** | 6 | 42 | 3 | 13 | 26 | 32 | 86 | -54 | 22 | **22nd of 22**; Relegated | — | — | — | QR1 | 0-0-1 | QR2 | 1-0-1 | R4 | |
| 1998–99 | **Northern Premier League**; **Division One** | 7 | 42 | 9 | 8 | 25 | 53 | 86 | -33 | 35 | **22nd of 22**; Relegated | — | — | — | QR1 | 0-0-1 | R2 | 0-0-1 | R4 | |
| 1999–2000 | **Northern Counties East League**; **Premier Division** | 8 | 38 | 17 | 11 | 10 | 73 | 49 | +24 | 62 | **5th of 20** | — | — | — | PR | 0-0-1 | FA Vase (Note: With Alfreton's relegation to the Northern Counties East League they dropped to Level 9 of the English football league system thus becoming ineligible to take part in the FA Trophy. They instead competed in the FA Vase, for clubs between Levels 9–11) R5 | 0-0-1 | SF | |
| 2000–01 | **Northern Counties East League**; **Premier Division** | 8 | 38 | 23 | 4 | 11 | 71 | 44 | +27 | 73 | **3rd of 20** | Caine Cheetham | 24 | — | QR2 | 2-1-1 | FA Vase R2 | 0-0-1 | SF | |
| 2001–02 | **Northern Counties East League**; **Premier Division** | 8 | 38 | 27 | 5 | 6 | 94 | 36 | +58 | 86 | **1st of 20**; Promoted | Mick Godber | 20 | — | QR2 | 1-0-1 | FA Vase R2 | 0-0-1 | W (Note: Won the Derbyshire Senior Cup with a 5–4 aggregate victory over Gresley Rovers.) | Chris Wilder |
| 2002–03 | **Northern Premier League**; **Division One** | 7 | 42 | 26 | 9 | 7 | 106 | 59 | +47 | 87 | **1st of 22**; Promoted | Mick Godber | 24 | 388 | QR1 | 1-0-1 | R4 | 4-1-1 | W (Note: Won the Derbyshire Senior Cup with a 7–1 aggregate victory over Mickleover Sports.) | David Lloyd |
| 2003–04 | **Northern Premier League**; **Premier Division** | 6 | 44 | 23 | 9 | 12 | 73 | 43 | +30 | 78 | **4th of 23** | Mick Godber | 18 | 402 | QR2 | 0-0-1 | R3 | 2-2-1 | R5 | David Lloyd |
Conference North, a new sixth tier league created, club qualified to join it.
| 2004–05 | **Conference North** | 6 | 42 | 15 | 8 | 19 | 53 | 55 | -2 | 53 | **14th of 22** | Peter Duffield | 21 | 398 | R1 | 3-2-1 | R4 | 3-1-1 | SF | David Lloyd |
| 2005–06 | **Conference North** | 6 | 42 | 10 | 15 | 17 | 46 | 58 | -12 | 45 | **17th of 22** | Jon Stevenson | 11 | 334 | QR4 | 2-2-0 | R1 | 1-1-1 | SF | Gary Mills |
| 2006–07 | **Conference North** | 6 | 42 | 14 | 12 | 16 | 44 | 50 | -6 | 54 | **14th of 22** | — | — | 295 | QR2 | 0-1-1 | QR3 | 0-0-1 | R3 | Gary Mills; Marcus Ebdon |
| 2007–08 | **Conference North** | 6 | 42 | 12 | 11 | 19 | 49 | 54 | -5 | 47 | **16th of 22** | Brian Cusworth | 9 | 363 | QR2 | 0-1-1 | R2 | 2-1-1 | F (Note: Lost 4–3 on aggregate in the Derbyshire Senior Cup final to Belper Town.) | Nicky Law |
| 2008–09 | **Conference North** | 6 | 42 | 20 | 17 | 5 | 81 | 48 | +33 | 77 | **3rd of 22** | Liam Hearn | 21 | 439 | R2 | 4-1-1 | R1 | 1-0-1 | R4 | Nicky Law |
| 2008–09 | **Conference North** | 6 | Lost in the **play-off** semifinal. | | | | | | | | | | | | R2 | 4-1-1 | R1 | 1-0-1 | R4 | Nicky Law |
| 2009–10 | **Conference North** | 6 | 40 | 21 | 11 | 8 | 77 | 45 | +32 | 74 | **3rd of 21** | Paul Clayton; Liam Hearn | 16 | 493 | QR3 | 1-1-1 | QR3 | 0-1-1 | R3 | Nicky Law |
| 2009–10 | **Conference North** | 6 | Lost in the **play-off** final. | | | | | | | | | | | | QR3 | 1-1-1 | QR3 | 0-1-1 | R3 | Nicky Law |
| 2010–11 | **Conference North** | 6 | 40 | 29 | 5 | 6 | 97 | 33 | +64 | 92 | **1st of 21**; Promoted | Liam Hearn | 29 | 760 | QR2 | 0-1-1 | R3 | 3-2-1 | R4 | Nicky Law |
| 2011–12 | **Conference Premier** | 5 | 46 | 15 | 9 | 22 | 62 | 86 | -24 | 54 | **15th of 24** | Nathan Jarman | 12 | 1,063 | R1 | 1-1-1 | R3 | 2-0-1 | R3 | Nicky Law |
| 2012–13 | **Conference Premier** | 5 | 46 | 16 | 12 | 18 | 69 | 74 | -5 | 60 | **13th of 24** | Paul Clayton | 17 | 747 | R2 | 2-0-1 | R1 | 0-0-1 | SF | Nicky Law |
| 2013–14 | **Conference Premier** | 5 | 46 | 21 | 7 | 18 | 69 | 74 | -5 | 67 (Note: Alfreton were deducted three points for fielding an ineligible player against Kidderminster Harriers in December.) | **11th of 24** | John Akinde | 17 | 805 | R1 | 1-0-1 | R1 | 0-0-1 | R3 | Nicky Law |
| 2014–15 | **Conference Premier** | 5 | 46 | 12 | 9 | 25 | 49 | 90 | -41 | 45 | **21st of 24**; Relegated | Karl Hawley | 10 | 804 | QR4 | 0-1-1 | R2 | 1-0-1 | QF | Nicky Law |
Fifth and sixth tier divisions renamed.
| 2015–16 | **National League North** | 6 | 42 | 15 | 13 | 14 | 58 | 54 | +4 | 58 | **10th of 22** | Sam Jones | 13 | 583 | QR4 | 2-0-1 | QR3 | 0-0-1 | W | Nicky Law |
| 2016–17 | **National League North** | 6 | 42 | 11 | 9 | 22 | 62 | 95 | -33 | 42 | **18th of 22** | Craig Westcarr | 13 | 547 | R1 | 3-2-1 | R2 | 2-1-1 | SF | Nicky Law |
| 2017–18 | **National League North** | 6 | 42 | 14 | 7 | 21 | 67 | 71 | -4 | 49 | **17th of 22** | Brendon Daniels | 13 | 577 | QR3 | 1-1-1 | QR3 | 0-0-1 | F | John McDermott; Chris Moyses |
| 2018–19 | **National League North** | 6 | 42 | 13 | 12 | 17 | 53 | 67 | -14 | 51 | **15th of 22** | Reece Styche | 11 | 535 | R1 | 3-1-1 | QR3 | 0-1-1 | W | Billy Heath |
| 2019–20 | **National League North** | 6 | 32 | 12 | 4 | 16 | 48 | 55 | -7 | 40 | **13th of 22** | Amari Morgan-Smith | 15 | 497 | QR2 | 0-1-1 | QR3 | 0-1-1 | QF | Billy Heath |
| 2019–20 | **National League North** | 6 | The regular season was cut short due to COVID-19, final league positions decided by points-per-game | | | | | | | | | | | | QR2 | 0-1-1 | QR3 | 0-1-1 | QF | Billy Heath |
| 2020–21 | **National League North** | 6 | 15 | 2 | 6 | 7 | 15 | 27 | -15 | 12 | **21st of 22** | Elliott Reeves | 5 | – (Note: COVID-19 prevented fans from attending games) | QR3 | 1-0-0 | R3 | 0-0-1 | not held | Billy Heath |
| 2020–21 | **National League North** | 6 | The season was declared null and void due to COVID-19 | | | | | | | | | | | | QR3 | 1-0-0 | R3 | 0-0-1 | not held | Billy Heath |
| 2021–22 | **National League North** | 6 | 42 | 17 | 10 | 15 | 58 | 59 | -1 | 61 | **9th of 22** | Matt Rhead | 12 | 536 | QR2 | 2-1-0 | R4 | 2-0-1 | not held | Billy Heath |
| 2022–23 | **National League North** | 6 | 46 | 17 | 18 | 11 | 54 | 44 | +10 | 69 | **5th of 24** | Matt Rhead | 13 | 521 | QR2 | 0-0-1 | R2 | 0-0-1 | | Billy Heath |
| 2022–23 | **National League North** | 6 | Lost in the play-off quarter-final. | | | | | | | | | | | | QR2 | 0-0-1 | R2 | 0-0-1 | | Billy Heath |
| 2023–24 | **National League North** | 6 | 46 | 23 | 11 | 12 | 76 | 50 | +26 | 80 | **5th of 24** | Jordan Thewlis | 17 | 568 | R2 | 4-1-1 | R2 | 0-0-1 | | Billy Heath |
| 2023–24 | **National League North** | 6 | Lost in the play-off quarter-final. | | | | | | | | | | | | R2 | 4-1-1 | R2 | 0-0-1 | | Billy Heath |
| 2024–25 | **National League North** | 6 | 46 | 15 | 14 | 17 | 54 | 59 | -5 | 80 | **14th of 24** | Lewis Salmon | 12 | 490 | R1 | 2-2-1 | R3 | 1-0-1 | | Billy Heath |

== Notes ==
- Source: Alfreton Town at the Football Club History Database
