= Worksop Town F.C. =

English football club

Coordinates: 53.3115°N 1.1314°W

Worksop Town
- Full name: Worksop Town Football Club
- Nickname: The Tigers
- Founded: 1861 (Disputed) (Note: The club itself claims to have been formed in 1861, but this claim is based on club minute books from 1914 rather than contemporary sources. Football historian Martin Westby suggests a foundation year of 1873, based on a newspaper article from that year reporting a rugby union game at the Worksop Pestallozzian School as being 'probably the first game of football ever played in the town'. The earliest record of association football being played in Worksop comes from 1875, when a club representing the town first started playing regular fixtures. The club has also been dissolved and reformed on several occasions, most notably in 1930.)
- Ground: KC Sofas Stadium, Worksop
- Capacity: 3400 (627 seats)
- Owner: Peter Whitehead
- Chairman: John Stainrod
- Manager: Craig Parry
- League: National League North
- 2025–26: National League North, 16th of 24
- Website: worksoptownfc.com
Home colours	Away colours

Worksop Town Football Club is an English football club based in Worksop, Nottinghamshire. The team play in the National League North. They are nicknamed The Tigers and play their home games at Sandy Lane in Worksop.

== History ==
=== Previous clubs ===
The club claims it was originally founded in 1861, which would make it the fourth oldest association football club in the world, however, no contemporary evidence to back up this claim has yet been found. As of 2023, the earliest record of a game of association football being played in the town comes from December 1875, when the Sheffield Daily Telegraph reported that a Worksop team had won its opening match against Harthill. The earliest record of the club using the "Town" suffix comes from 1882, when Worksop played Eckington on 18 February.

The Town club joined the Sheffield & District Football League in 1892 and also played in the Sheffield Association League during the late 1890s after an unsuccessful one-year spell in the Midland League. Worksop re-joined the Midland League in 1900 and became a prominent member of the competition before the First World War. They finished third in the league in 1903 and, in 1908, reached the first round of the FA Cup for the first time, losing 1–9 at Stamford Bridge to Chelsea in front of 18,995 spectators.

After the First World War put a halt to football activity in the town, the game returned in 1919 when Worksop Town and Manton Athletic merged to become Worksop and Manton Athletic, although the Worksop Town name remained in popular usage. The club joined the Midland League and in 1921 won the competition for the first time. The 1920s provided the club with its best spell in the FA Cup, reaching the first round in four out of six seasons from 1921. In 1923, they drew Tottenham Hotspur at White Hart Lane – the Tigers pulled off a shock by holding Spurs to a goal-less draw. The Worksop board decided against hosting the replay at Central Avenue, and they were beaten 0–9 in the replay two days after the original tie, again at White Hart Lane. In 1926, they reached the second round for the first time after beating Coventry City at Central Avenue in the first round – eventually losing 3-1 to Chesterfield in the next round.

In 1930, the club withdrew from the Midland League and disbanded, with a new Worksop Town club being formed a week later. The new outfit initially played in the Sheffield Association League and Central Combination, before joining the Yorkshire League in 1935. This latest incarnation lasted less than a decade, being wound up during the Second World War.

=== Current club ===
After the end of the Second World War, another new club was formed by the name of Worksop Town Athletic, although the Athletic suffix would soon fall out of use. They initially competed in the Sheffield Association League, but later joining the Midland League. In 1956, they progressed to the third round of the FA Cup for the only time in their history, beating Skegness Town and Bradford City before losing to Swindon Town at the County Ground. Worksop won their second Midland League title in 1966 before becoming a founder member of the Northern Premier League (NPL) two years later. They returned to the Midland League after just one year, however, as the Tigers finished bottom in the NPL's inaugural season.

Worksop won their third and last Midland League title in 1973 and, a year later, re-joined the NPL, eventually finding their feet at this higher level. In 1978, they once more reached the first round of the FA Cup, losing 5-1 to Barnsley at Oakwell. In 1989, they were relegated to Division 1 of the NPL, and had to move to play in Gainsborough when they were evicted from their Central Avenue home. They then spent three years in Gainsborough before returning to the newly built Sandy Lane ground in Worksop in 1992.

The Tigers regained NPL Premier Division status in 1998, and in 1999 finished as runner-up in the NPL, only just missing promotion to the Football Conference. From 2000-2002 ex England international Chris Waddle was playing for Worksop, during his 2 years at the club he made 60 appearances and scored 3 goals. In 2004, they were a founder member of the Conference North, but only lasted three years in the division before being relegated back to the Northern Premier League. It was around this time that the club fell into financial difficulties and lost ownership of its home ground at Sandy Lane, being forced to rent the grounds of Hucknall Town, Ilkeston Town and Retford United for three years.

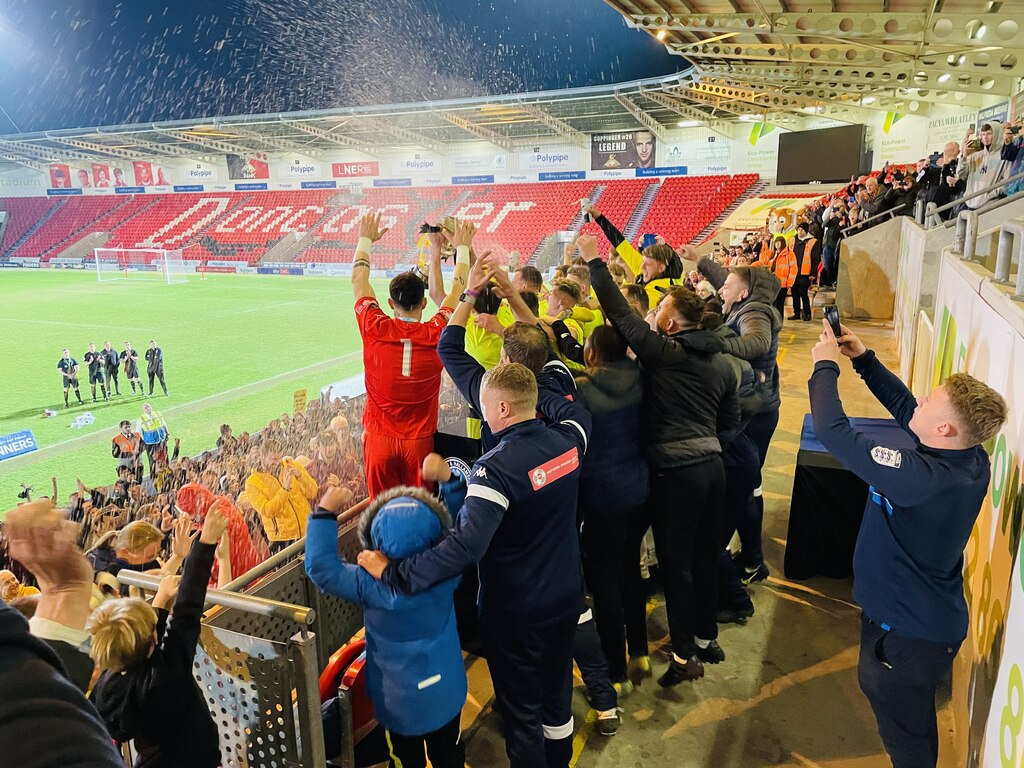
Worksop Town celebrate winning the 2021-22 Sheffield and Hallamshire Senior Cup

In 2011, the club finally returned to Sandy Lane, but this time as tenants of Worksop Parramore, which had bought the ground and allowed the Tigers to play there. The 2013–14 season almost saw Worksop promoted back to the Conference North but they were beaten in the league play-off semi-finals. At the end of the season, the club's owner, Jason Clark, revealed that he would no longer be funding the club, plunging it into a financial crisis, and shortly afterwards the decision was taken to resign from the Northern Premier League and to join the Northern Counties East League (NCEL), entering the NCEL's Premier Division.

The drop to the ninth level of the English football league system also meant a first foray into the FA Vase, having previously competed in the FA Trophy. Worksop were crowned Northern Counties East League champions at the end of the 2018–19 season, winning promotion back to the Northern Premier League.

On 18 March 2023, the club won the Division One East title in the Northern Premier League with seven games of the season remaining, the first team in English football to secure promotion in the 2022–23 season.

The 2023-24 season saw the newly promoted team finish the season in 5th place, which earned them a play-off semi final tie against Macclesfield Town. The game was played at Macclesfield's Moss Rose ground, and the final result was a 2-1 loss. On 9 May Worksop finished off their season by beating Penistone Church F.C. 5-0 at Sheffield Wednesdays Ground, Hillsborough, to win the Sheffield & Hallamshire Senior Cup for a record equalling 14th time.

The 2024-25 season saw Worksop constantly around the play-off spots, eventually finishing second to runaway winners Macclesfield. Play-off victories of 2-1 against Ashton United F.C. and 2-1 against Guiseley AFC, saw Worksop promoted back to the National League North, the league they were relegated from in 2007. On 8 May 2025 Worksop again contested the final of the Sheffield & Hallamshire Senior Cup at Hillsborough. This time beating Hallam FC 2-1 to win the cup for a record 15th time.

The 2025-26 season saw The Tigers compete at the National League North level for the first time since 2007. Although tipped for relegation by many, they spent most of the season above the relegation zone, eventually finishing the season in 16th place out of 24. On 28 April 2026 Worksop contested the final of the Sheffield & Hallamshire Senior Cup for the 37th time. They beat Worsbrough Bridge Athletic F.C. by a scoreline of 2-1, to win the cup for a record 16th time.. The game was played at Doncaster Rovers home ground, The Eco-Power Stadium. In taking the victory they became the first team since 1899 to win the cup for three years in a row.

=== Season-by-season record ===
Season	Division	Level	Position	FA Cup	FA Trophy	FA Vase	Notes
1892–93	Sheffield & District League	-	12th/14	-	-	-	
1893–94	Sheffield & District League Division 1	-	4th/5	3QR	-	-	
1894–95	Sheffield Challenge Cup League	-	8th/15	4QR	-	-	
1895–96	Sheffield Challenge Cup League	-		2QR	-	-	
1896–97	Midland League	-	14th/15	4QR	-	-	
1897–98	Sheffield Association League	-	3rd/12	1QR	-	-	
1898–99	Sheffield Association League	-	1st/14	2QR	-	-	Joint league champions (drew play-off)
1899–1900	Sheffield Association League	-	2nd/9	1QR	-	-	
1900–01	Midland League	-	12th/14	2QR	-	-	
1901–02	Midland League	-	10th/15	3QR	-	-	
1902–03	Midland League	-	3rd/17	1QR	-	-	
1903–04	Midland League	-	16th/18	3QR	-	-	
1904–05	Midland League	-	9th/17	2QR	-	-	
1905–06	Midland League	-	15th/18	2QR	-	-	
1906–07	Midland League	-	14th/20	-	-	-	
1907–08	Midland League	-	9th/20	1R	-	-	
1908–09	Midland League	-	20th/20	1QR	-	-	
1909–10	Midland League	-	15th/22	2QR	-	-	
1910–11	Midland League	-	20th/20	2QR	-	-	
1911–12	Midland League	-	18th/19	2QR	-	-	
1912–13	Midland League	-	17th/20	1QR	-	-	
1913–14	Midland League	-	13th/18	2QR	-	-	
1914–15	Midland League	-	8th/20	1QR	-	-	
1915–16	Club did not enter any competitions due to World War I						
1916–17	Club did not enter any competitions due to World War I						
1917–18	Club did not enter any competitions due to World War I						
1918–19	Club did not enter any competitions due to World War I						
1919–20	Midland League	-	4th/18	PR	-	-	
1920–21	Midland League	-	10th/20	6QR	-	-	
1921–22	Midland League	-	1st/22	1R	-	-	League champions
1922–23	Midland League	-	3rd/22	1R	-	-	
1923–24	Midland League	-	3rd/22	5QR	-	-	Sheffield & Hallamshire Senior Cup Winners
1924–25	Midland League	-	4th/15	1QR	-	-	
1925–26	Midland League	-	11th/21	2R	-	-	
1926–27	Midland League	-	11th/20	1R	-	-	
1927–28	Midland League	-	11th/23	4QR	-	-	
1928–29	Midland League	-	26th/26	2QR	-	-	
1929–30	Midland League	-	24th/26	4QR	-	-	
Club dissolved (1930) and reformed (1930)
1931–32	Sheffield Association League Division 2	-	5th/12	4QR	-	-	
1932–33	Sheffield Association League Division 2	-	4th/12	3QR	-	-	
1933–34	Central Combination	-	9th/17	2QR	-	-	
1934–35	Central Combination	-	6th/15	3QR	-	-	
1935–36	Yorkshire League	-	3rd/20	PR	-	-	
1936–37	Yorkshire League	-	5th/19	1QR	-	-	
1937–38	Yorkshire League	-	5th/20	4QR	-	-	
1938–39	Yorkshire League	-	7th/20	PR	-	-	
1939–40	Yorkshire League	-	–	–	-	-	Season abandoned due to outbreak of World War II
Club dissolved (1940) and reformed (1946)
1946–47	Worksop Amateur League	-	2nd/17	-	-	-	
1947–48	Sheffield Association League	-	1st/20	-	-	-	League champions
1948–49	Sheffield Association League	-	1st/18	-	-	-	League champions
1949–50	Midland League	-	20th/24	PR	-	-	
1950–51	Midland League	-	12th/22	3QR	-	-	
1951–52	Midland League	-	10th/22	3QR	-	-	
1952–53	Midland League	-	19th/24	1QR	-	-	Sheffield & Hallamshire Senior Cup Winners
1953–54	Midland League	-	10th/24	4QR	-	-	
1954–55	Midland League	-	14th/24	4QR	-	-	Sheffield & Hallamshire Senior Cup Winners
1955–56	Midland League	-	16th/24	3R	-	-	
1956–57	Midland League	-	8th/24	4QR	-	-	
1957–58	Midland League	-	24th/24	1QR	-	-	
1958–59	Midland League	-	19th/19	2QR	-	-	
1959–60	Midland League	-	14th/17	2QR	-	-	
1960–61	Central Alliance Division 1 North	-	6th/18	1QR	-	-	
1961–62	Midland League	-	3rd/18	1R	-	-	
1962–63	Midland League	-	2nd/20	3QR	-	-	
1963–64	Midland League	-	9th/22	3QR	-	-	
1964–65	Midland League	-	18th/22	2QR	-	-	
1965–66	Midland League	-	1st/22	3QR	-	-	Sheffield & Hallamshire Senior Cup Winners League champions
1966–67	Midland League	-	2nd/22	3QR	-	-	
1967–68	Midland League	-	9th/21	PR	-	-	
1968–69	Northern Premier League	-	20th/20	1QR	-	-	Relegated
1969–70	Midland League	-	6th/18	2QR	1QR	-	Sheffield & Hallamshire Senior Cup Winners
1970–71	Midland League	-	7th/18	1QR	3QR	-	
1971–72	Midland League	-	6th/18	3QR	1R	-	
1972–73	Midland League	-	1st/18	3QR	1R	-	Sheffield & Hallamshire Senior Cup Winners. League champions
1973–74	Midland League	-	2nd/17	3QR	2R	-	Promoted
1974–75	Northern Premier League	-	14th/24	3QR	1R	-	
1975–76	Northern Premier League	-	13th/24	4QR	1R	-	
1976–77	Northern Premier League	-	13th/23	3QR	1QR	-	
1977–78	Northern Premier League	-	20th/24	3QR	1QR	-	
1978–79	Northern Premier League	-	13th/24	1R	1QR	-	
1979–80	Northern Premier League	-	7th/22	2QR	2QR	-	
1980–81	Northern Premier League	-	12th/22	3QR	1QR	-	
1981–82	Northern Premier League	-	12th/22	2QR	2QR	-	Sheffield & Hallamshire Senior Cup Winners
1982–83	Northern Premier League	-	21st/22	2QR	1QR	-	
1983–84	Northern Premier League	-	17th/22	1QR	3QR	-	
1984–85	Northern Premier League	-	7th/22	2QR	3QR	-	Sheffield & Hallamshire Senior Cup Winners
1985–86	Northern Premier League	-	7th/22	2QR	2QR	-	
1986–87	Northern Premier League	-	19th/22	2QR	2QR	-	
1987–88	Northern Premier League Premier Division	-	6th/22	1QR	2QR	-	
1988–89	Northern Premier League Premier Division	-	22nd/22	1QR	2QR	-	Relegated
1989–90	Northern Premier League Division 1	-	22nd/22	PR	1QR	-	
1990–91	Northern Premier League Division 1	-	3rd/22	2QR	1QR	-	
1991–92	Northern Premier League Division 1	-	3rd/22	1QR	1QR	-	
1992–93	Northern Premier League Division 1	-	11th/21	2QR	1QR	-	
1993–94	Northern Premier League Division 1	-	12th/21	3QR	1QR	-	
1994–95	Northern Premier League Division 1	-	6th/22	2QR	1QR	-	Sheffield & Hallamshire Senior Cup Winners
1995–96	Northern Premier League Division 1	-	11th/21	2QR	1QR	-	
1996–97	Northern Premier League Division 1	-	5th/22	PR	3QR	-	Sheffield & Hallamshire Senior Cup Winners
1997–98	Northern Premier League Division 1	-	2nd/22	3QR	1R	-	Promoted
1998–99	Northern Premier League Premier Division	-	2nd/22	3QR	2R	-	
1999–2000	Northern Premier League Premier Division	-	10th/23	2QR	4R	-	
2000–01	Northern Premier League Premier Division	-	5th/23	2QR	QF	-	
2001–02	Northern Premier League Premier Division	-	4th/23	1R	4R	-	
2002–03	Northern Premier League Premier Division	-	5th/23	3QR	4R	-	Sheffield & Hallamshire Senior Cup Winners
2003–04	Northern Premier League Premier Division	-	7th/23	3QR	4R	-	
2004–05	Football Conference North	6	17th/22	4QR	1R	-	
2005–06	Football Conference North	6	19th/22	2QR	QF	-	
2006–07	Football Conference North	6	21st/22	2QR	3QR	-	Relegated
2007–08	Northern Premier League Premier Division	7	9th/21	1QR	1QR	-	
2008–09	Northern Premier League Premier Division	7	7th/22	2QR	2QR	-	
2009–10	Northern Premier League Premier Division	7	18th/20	1QR	1QR	-	
2010–11	Northern Premier League Premier Division	7	7th/22	1QR	1R	-	
2011–12	Northern Premier League Premier Division	7	15th/22	1QR	2R	-	Sheffield & Hallamshire Senior Cup Winners
2012–13	Northern Premier League Premier Division	7	9th/22	1QR	1R	-	
2013–14	Northern Premier League Premier Division	7	4th/24	3QR	1QR	-	Resigned from the league & dropped 2 steps of the pyramid.
2014–15	Northern Counties East League Premier Division	9	2nd/21	EPR	-	4R	
2015–16	Northern Counties East League Premier Division	9	4th/22	EPR	-	2R	
2016–17	Northern Counties East League Premier Division	9	13th/22	PR	-	2R	
2017–18	Northern Counties East League Premier Division	9	18th/22	EPR	-	3R	
2018–19	Northern Counties East League Premier Division	9	1st/20	1QR	-	2QR	League champions, promoted
2019–20	Northern Premier League Division One South East	8	–	EP	1QR	-	League season abandoned due to COVID-19 pandemic
2020–21	Northern Premier League Division One South East	8	–	EP	3QR	-	League season abandoned due to COVID-19 pandemic
2021–22	Northern Premier League Division One East	8	8th/19	EP	1QR	-	Sheffield & Hallamshire Senior Cup Winners
2022–23	Northern Premier League Division One East	8	1st/20	EP	1R	-	League champions, promoted
2023–24	Northern Premier League Premier Division	7	5th/21	1R	1R	-	Sheffield & Hallamshire Senior Cup Winners
2024–25	Northern Premier League Premier Division	7	2nd/22	3QR	2R	-	Sheffield & Hallamshire Senior Cup Winners, promoted via play-offs
2025–26	National League North	6	16th/24	2QR	3R	-	Sheffield & Hallamshire Senior Cup Winners
Season	Division	Level	Position	FA Cup	FA Trophy	FA Vase	Notes
Source: Football Club History Database

== Current squad ==
As of 18 August 2026

Note: Flags indicate national team as defined under FIFA eligibility rules; some limited exceptions apply. Players may hold more than one non-FIFA nationality.

No.	Pos.	Nation	Player
1	GK	ENG	Max Dearnley
2	DF	ENG	Deegan Atherton
3	DF	ENG	Josh Wilde
4	MF	ENG	Sam Essien
5	DF	WAL	Rollin Menayese
6	DF	ENG	Andrew Boyce
7	MF	ENG	Vaughan Redford
8	MF	LAT	Aleksandrs Starcenko
10	FW	ENG	Oliver Greaves
11	FW	ENG	Lewis Whitham

No.	Pos.	Nation	Player
12	DF	ENG	Mason O'Malley
13	GK	ENG	Josh Render
14	FW	ENG	Chae Whitman-Brown
16	MF	ENG	Sam Wedgbury (player-coach)
17	MF	ENG	Ben Hatton
19	FW	ENG	Ryan Viggars
22	DF	GHA	Jay Abudu
23	FW	ENG	Ben Tomlinson (player-coach)
25	MF	ENG	Liam Waldock
26	MF	ENG	Alex Russell

== Managers ==
From	To	Manager
	1982	Ronnie Reid
1982	1983	R. Barrett
1983	1984	J. Saunders
1984	1987	Tommy Spencer
1987	1988	Bryan Chambers
1988	1990	Brian Fidler
1990	1997	Tommy Spencer
1997	2003	Paul Mitchell

From	To	Manager
2003	2004	Steve Ludlam
2004	2007	Ronnie Glavin
2007	2011	Peter Rinkcavage
2011	2011	Martin McIntosh
2011	2013	Simon Clark
2013	2016	Mark Shaw

From	To	Manager
2017	2018	Ryan Hindley
2018	2018	Duncan Milligan
2018	2019	Craig Denton
2019	2020	Kyle Jordan
2020	present	Craig Parry

== Grounds ==
Worksop initially played at two different grounds on Netherton Road before, along with the cricket club, it moved to Bridge Meadow, also known as Newcastle Avenue, in 1891. This had separate cricket and football pitches along with a quarter-mile track. In 1901, it moved across the River Ryton to Central Avenue, staying there until 1988, when it was forced to move, and play in Gainsborough. It returned to its home town in 1992 when a new ground was built on Sandy Lane. It lost ownership of Sandy Lane in 2005 and again had to groundshare elsewhere before returning to Sandy Lane in 2011, this time as tenants of Worksop Parramore.

=== Gallery ===
A series of pictures taken at the Worksop Town vs. Sheffield Wednesday friendly match in July 2011.

The main stand.

The north end of the ground.

The west end of the ground.

The east end of the ground, with clubhouse.

== Honours ==
=== League ===
- Northern Premier League Premier Division
  - Runners-up: 1998–99
  - Play-off winners: 2024–25
- Northern Premier League Division One
  - Runners-up: 1997–98
- Northern Premier League Division One East
  - Winners: 2022–23
- Midland League
  - Champions: 1921–22, 1965–66, 1972–73
  - Runners-up: 1962–63, 1966–67, 1973–74
- Sheffield Association League
  - Champions: 1898–99 (joint), 1947–48, 1948–49
  - Runners-up: 1899–1900
- Northern Counties East League Premier Division
  - Champions: 2018–19
  - Runners-up: 2014–15

=== Cup ===
- Northern Premier League Cup
  - Runners-up: 1999–2000
- Sheffield & Hallamshire Senior Cup
  - Winners: 1923–24, 1952–53, 1954–55, 1965–66, 1969–70, 1972–73, 1981–82, 1984–85, 1994–95, 1996–97, 2002–03, 2011–12, 2021–22, 2023–24, 2024–25, 2025–26
  - Runners-up: 1899–1900, 1912–13, 1914–15, 1924–25, 1935–36, 1938–39, 1953–54, 1956–57, 1960–61, 1973–74, 1975–76, 1976–77, 1979–80, 1987–88, 1990–91, 1992–93, 1993–94, 2003–04, 2004–05, 2006–07, 2007–08
- Sheffield & Hallamshire Invitation Cup
  - Runners up: 1927–28
- Northern Premier League Chairman's Cup
  - Winners: 2001–02
- Northern Premier League President's Cup
  - Winners: 1985–86, 1995–96
- Northern Counties East League League Cup
  - Winners: 2018–2019

== Records ==
- Best FA Cup performance: third round, 1955–56
- Best FA Trophy performance: quarter-finals, 2000–01, 2005–06
- Best FA Vase performance: fourth round, 2014–15
