= 1961–62 Midland Football League =

Midland Football League
- Season: 1961–62
- Champions: Matlock Town
- Matches: 306
- Goals: 1,187 (3.88 per match)

The 1961–62 Midland Football League season was the 62nd in the history of the Midland Football League, a football competition in England.

Due to financial problems the league folded and no matches were played in the previous season.

== Clubs ==
The league featured six clubs which competed in the previous season, along with twelve new clubs.

- Club spent previous season without league football:
  - Skegness Town
- Returned to the league after one season in the Central Alliance:
  - Denaby United
  - Goole Town
  - Sutton Town
  - Worksop Town
- Returned to the league after one season in both the Central Alliance and the Yorkshire League:
  - Gainsborough Trinity
- Joined from the Central Alliance:
  - Alfreton Town
  - Belper Town
  - Bourne Town
  - Grantham
  - Heanor Town
  - Ilkeston Town
  - Long Eaton United
  - Loughborough United
  - Matlock Town
  - Spalding United
  - Stamford
- Joined from the Yorkshire League:
  - Retford Town

== League table ==
Pos	Team	Pld	W	D	L	GF	GA	GR	Pts
1	Matlock Town	34	23	5	6	99	52	1.904	51
2	Retford Town	34	20	6	8	88	66	1.333	46
3	Worksop Town	34	20	3	11	88	60	1.467	43
4	Ilkeston Town	34	18	7	9	65	38	1.711	43
5	Denaby United	34	17	7	10	60	48	1.250	41
6	Sutton Town	34	18	4	12	71	53	1.340	40
7	Belper Town	34	15	8	11	78	50	1.560	38
8	Grantham	34	14	7	13	71	58	1.224	35
9	Loughborough United	34	13	7	14	61	61	1.000	33
10	Gainsborough Trinity	34	14	5	15	65	64	1.016	33
11	Goole Town	34	13	7	14	68	63	1.079	33
12	Long Eaton United	34	12	5	17	53	75	0.707	29
13	Heanor Town	34	11	7	16	54	66	0.818	29
14	Bourne Town	34	10	9	15	59	71	0.831	29
15	Skegness Town	34	10	6	18	55	82	0.671	26
16	Stamford	34	10	6	18	57	97	0.588	26
17	Spalding United	34	9	3	22	47	83	0.566	21
18	Alfreton Town	34	6	4	24	48	100	0.480	16

Source: nonleaguematters
Rules for classification: 1) points; 2) goal difference; 3) number of goals scored.
The points system until the 1990–91 season: 2 points for a win, 1 point for a draw and 0 points for losing.
