= 1962–63 Midland Football League =

Midland Football League
- Season: 1962–63
- Champions: Loughborough United
- Matches: 380
- Goals: 1,447 (3.81 per match)

The 1962–63 Midland Football League season was the 63rd in the history of the Midland Football League, a football competition in England.

== Clubs ==
The league featured 18 clubs which competed in the previous season, along with two new clubs:

- Boston United, joined from the Central Alliance
- Holbeach United, joined from the Eastern Counties League

== League table ==
Pos	Team	Pld	W	D	L	GF	GA	GR	Pts	Qualification or relegation
1	Loughborough United	38	25	10	3	114	43	2.651	60	
2	Worksop Town	38	25	7	6	101	40	2.525	57	
3	Matlock Town	38	22	7	9	102	59	1.729	51	
4	Ilkeston Town	38	18	14	6	61	34	1.794	50	
5	Alfreton Town	38	18	14	6	83	50	1.660	50	
6	Boston United	38	19	12	7	89	66	1.348	50	
7	Belper Town	38	20	8	10	79	52	1.519	48	
8	Grantham	38	19	9	10	95	67	1.418	47	
9	Sutton Town	38	19	8	11	75	69	1.087	46	
10	Goole Town	38	14	10	14	72	62	1.161	38	
11	Heanor Town	38	15	7	16	73	74	0.986	37	
12	Bourne Town	38	15	7	16	75	88	0.852	37	
13	Denaby United	38	15	5	18	63	69	0.913	35	
14	Retford Town	38	12	6	20	72	82	0.878	30	
15	Gainsborough Trinity	38	12	3	23	69	94	0.734	27	
16	Stamford	38	12	1	25	61	112	0.545	25	
17	Skegness Town	38	8	6	24	42	95	0.442	22	
18	Long Eaton United	38	8	5	25	51	86	0.593	21	
19	Holbeach United	38	6	7	25	42	96	0.438	19	Transferred to the United Counties League
20	Spalding United	38	3	4	31	28	109	0.257	10	

Source: nonleaguematters
Rules for classification: 1) points; 2) goal difference; 3) number of goals scored.
The points system until the 1990–91 season: 2 points for a win, 1 point for a draw and 0 points for losing.
