= Jim Bullions =

Scottish footballer and manager (1924–2014)

Personal information
- Full name: James Law Bullions
- Date of birth: 12 March 1924
- Place of birth: Dennyloanhead, Scotland
- Date of death: June 2014 (aged 90)
- Place of death: Barlborough, Derbyshire, England
- Height: 5 ft 11 in (1.80 m)
- Position: Wing half

Youth career
- Chesterfield
- Clowne
- 1944–1946: Derby County

Senior career*
Years	Team	Apps	(Gls)
1946–1947	Derby County	17	(0)
1947–1950	Leeds United	35	(0)
1950–1954	Shrewsbury Town	131	(2)
1954–1956	Worksop Town		
1956	Gresley Rovers		
1956–1958	Sutton Town		
1958–1960	Matlock Town		
1960–1962	Alfreton Town		
Total		183	(2)

Managerial career
- 1960–1971: Alfreton Town
- * Club domestic league appearances and goals

James Law Bullions (12 March 1924 – June 2014) was a Scottish professional footballer who played as a wing half.

== Career ==
Born in Dennyloanhead, Bullions spent his early career as an amateur at Chesterfield and Clowne, before playing in the Football League for Derby County, Leeds United and Shrewsbury Town. He later played non-league football for Worksop Town, Gresley Rovers, Sutton Town, Matlock Town and Alfreton Town, also managing the latter club.

Bullions died in Barlborough, Derbyshire in June 2014, at the age of 90.

== Honours ==
Derby County

- FA Cup: 1945–46
