= 1964–65 Midland Football League =

Midland Football League
- Season: 1964–65
- Champions: Lockheed Leamington
- Relegated: Bourne Town; Denaby United
- Matches: 462
- Goals: 1,772 (3.84 per match)

The 1964–65 Midland Football League season was the 65th in the history of the Midland Football League, a football competition in England.

== Clubs ==
The league featured 21 clubs which competed in the previous season along with one new club, Ashton United who joined from the Lancashire Combination.

== League table ==
Pos	Team	Pld	W	D	L	GF	GA	GR	Pts	Qualification or relegation
1	Lockheed Leamington	42	28	9	5	113	59	1.915	65	
2	Grantham	42	28	5	9	110	63	1.746	61	
3	Heanor Town	42	25	8	9	96	45	2.133	58	
4	Ashton United	42	23	8	11	89	51	1.745	54	
5	Scarborough	42	22	10	10	116	67	1.731	54	
6	Goole Town	42	24	5	13	116	71	1.634	53	
7	Alfreton Town	42	21	8	13	91	67	1.358	50	
8	Long Eaton United	42	20	7	15	90	74	1.216	47	
9	Retford Town	42	18	8	16	86	66	1.303	44	
10	Belper Town	42	18	8	16	74	74	1.000	44	
11	Gainsborough Trinity	42	16	11	15	83	74	1.122	43	
12	Arnold	42	18	7	17	75	76	0.987	43	
13	Sutton Town	42	14	14	14	61	61	1.000	42	
14	Stamford	42	16	6	20	71	81	0.877	38	
15	Spalding United	42	14	9	19	73	87	0.839	37	
16	Loughborough United	42	12	12	18	66	86	0.767	36	
17	Matlock Town	42	13	9	20	74	90	0.822	35	
18	Worksop Town	42	13	9	20	67	82	0.817	35	
19	Ilkeston Town	42	10	6	26	58	110	0.527	26	
20	Skegness Town	42	10	6	26	45	110	0.409	26	
21	Bourne Town	42	6	6	30	64	125	0.512	18	Relegated to the United Counties League
22	Denaby United	42	4	7	31	54	153	0.353	15	Relegated to the Yorkshire League Division Two

Source: Non-League Football Matters
Rules for classification: 1) points; 2) goal difference; 3) number of goals scored.
The points system until the 1990–91 season: 2 points for a win, 1 point for a draw and 0 points for losing.
