= 1970–71 Midland Football League =

Midland Football League
- Season: 1970–71
- Champions: Grantham
- Promoted: Ilkeston Town; Lockheed Leamington
- Matches: 306
- Goals: 977 (3.19 per match)

The 1970–71 Midland Football League season was the 71st in the history of the Midland Football League, a football competition in England.

== Clubs ==
The league featured 17 clubs which competed in the previous season, along with one new club:

- Frickley Colliery, joined from the Cheshire County League

== League table ==
Pos	Team	Pld	W	D	L	GF	GA	GR	Pts	Qualification or relegation
1	Grantham	34	26	6	2	100	28	3.571	58	
2	Arnold	34	21	8	5	78	45	1.733	50	
3	Frickley Colliery	34	19	11	4	68	38	1.789	49	
4	Ilkeston Town	34	18	10	6	53	31	1.710	46	Promoted to the Southern Football League
5	Alfreton Town	34	18	6	10	83	39	2.128	42	
6	Lockheed Leamington	34	18	6	10	64	41	1.561	42	Promoted to the Southern Football League
7	Worksop Town	34	13	10	11	65	72	0.903	36	
8	Skegness Town	34	9	14	11	39	44	0.886	32	
9	Sutton Town	34	13	5	16	52	52	1.000	31	
10	Retford Town	34	13	5	16	65	88	0.739	31	
11	Belper Town	34	10	9	15	38	44	0.864	29	
12	Long Eaton United	34	11	6	17	50	63	0.794	28	
13	Heanor Town	34	7	13	14	46	60	0.767	27	
14	Loughborough United	34	7	13	14	37	53	0.698	27	
15	Ashby Institute	34	7	12	15	39	60	0.650	26	
16	Boston	34	7	11	16	36	54	0.667	25	
17	Stamford	34	3	12	19	31	72	0.431	18	
18	Warley	34	5	5	24	33	93	0.355	15	Transferred to the West Midlands (Regional) League

Source: nonleaguematters
Rules for classification: 1) points; 2) goal difference; 3) number of goals scored.
The points system until the 1990–91 season: 2 points for a win, 1 point for a draw and 0 points for losing.
