= 1963–64 Midland Football League =

Midland Football League
- Season: 1963–64
- Champions: Grantham
- Matches: 462
- Goals: 1,880 (4.07 per match)

The 1963–64 Midland Football League season was the 64th in the history of the Midland Football League, a football competition in England.

== Clubs ==
The league featured 19 clubs which competed in the previous season, along with three new clubs:

- Arnold St. Mary's joined from the Central Alliance, who also changed name to Arnold
- Lockheed Leamington transferred from the West Midlands (Regional) League
- Scarborough joined from the North Eastern League

== League table ==
Pos	Team	Pld	W	D	L	GF	GA	GR	Pts	Qualification or relegation
1	Grantham	42	33	6	3	152	56	2.714	72	
2	Scarborough	42	26	11	5	107	45	2.378	63	
3	Lockheed Leamington	42	23	8	11	114	60	1.900	54	
4	Alfreton Town	42	22	10	10	88	56	1.571	54	
5	Retford Town	42	22	8	12	94	70	1.343	52	
6	Gainsborough Trinity	42	22	4	16	92	81	1.136	48	
7	Heanor Town	42	20	7	15	76	71	1.070	47	
8	Long Eaton United	42	17	10	15	70	82	0.854	44	
9	Worksop Town	42	16	11	15	93	66	1.409	43	
10	Goole Town	42	18	7	17	94	99	0.949	43	
11	Boston United	42	20	2	20	91	92	0.989	42	Resigned from the league
12	Belper Town	42	16	10	16	87	94	0.926	42	
13	Ilkeston Town	42	15	11	16	73	75	0.973	41	
14	Spalding United	42	15	10	17	80	69	1.159	40	
15	Sutton Town	42	17	6	19	79	78	1.013	40	
16	Arnold	42	14	12	16	70	84	0.833	40	
17	Loughborough United	42	15	6	21	92	94	0.979	36	
18	Matlock Town	42	14	4	24	80	105	0.762	32	
19	Bourne Town	42	11	6	25	94	136	0.691	28	
20	Skegness Town	42	8	11	23	57	87	0.655	27	
21	Stamford	42	8	7	27	52	123	0.423	23	
22	Denaby United	42	4	5	33	45	157	0.287	13	

Source: nonleaguematters
Rules for classification: 1) points; 2) goal difference; 3) number of goals scored.
The points system until the 1990–91 season: 2 points for a win, 1 point for a draw and 0 points for losing.
