= Trevor Lawless =

English footballer (1932–2018)

Personal information
- Full name: Arthur Trevor Lawless
- Date of birth: 23 March 1932
- Place of birth: Cottam, England
- Date of death: 19 January 2018 (aged 85)
- Place of death: Radcliffe-on-Trent, England
- Position: Defender

Youth career
- Blackpool

Senior career*
Years	Team	Apps	(Gls)
1951–195?	Blackpool		
195?–1955	Worcester City		
1955–1956	Plymouth Argyle	8	(0)
1956–1957	Oldham Athletic	9	(0)
1957–1958	Aldershot	2	(0)
1958–1959	Southport	15	(0)
1959	Ton Pentre		
1960–1961	Loughborough United		
1963–1966	Stamford		
1966–1967	Sutton Town		
Total		34	(0)

Managerial career
- 1960–1961: Loughborough United (player-manager)
- 1963–1966: Stamford (player-manager)
- 1966–1967: Sutton Town (player-manager)
- * Club domestic league appearances and goals

Arthur Trevor Lawless (23 March 1932 – 19 January 2018) was an English professional footballer who played as a defender in the Football League for Plymouth Argyle, Oldham Athletic, Aldershot and Southport. He then went into coaching, and acted as player-coach or player-manager at non-league level.

== Life and career ==
Lawless was born in Cottam, Nottinghamshire, in 1932, and attended King Edward VI Grammar School in nearby Retford. He was on the books of Football League First Division club Blackpool as a junior, without breaking through to the first team, and also played cricket as a fast bowler. In August 1952, he made a single appearance in the Minor Counties Championship for Nottinghamshire second eleven against Lancashire II at Old Trafford; he returned bowling figures of 2/35 and made a duck.

While a student at Worcester Teacher Training College, Lawless played football for Southern League club Worcester City. In 1955, he had a successful trial with Second Division club Plymouth Argyle, and began the season not only in the first team but as its captain. He lost his place after just eight matches, and moved on to Oldham Athletic of the Third Division North in July 1956 for what was reported as a small fee. After three months with no first-team football, he asked for a transfer. He eventually made his debut, playing at right back at home to Barrow on 1 December, and had a run of games at centre half in January, before submitting a second transfer request at the start of February because he wanted to return to the south of England. He took his appearance total to nine by the end of the season, and spent some of the close season on a Football Association coaching course at Lilleshall, with the intention of becoming a full-time coach after his playing career ended.

Lawless signed for Aldershot for the 1957–58 Third Division South season. Two minutes into the opening fixture, against Port Vale, his weak back-pass to his goalkeeper was intercepted by an opponent who scored the only goal of the match. Lawless lost his place, and his Aldershot career continued in the reserves until a dislocated elbow brought it to a temporary halt in November. He appeared once more for the first team, in February, but did not defend well, and was given a free transfer at the end of the season.

His next club was Southport, newly placed in the Fourth Division when the regional third tiers were reorganised on a national basis. He initially signed as a full-time professional, but went part-time from 1 September when he was appointed to a teaching post in the town, and later acted as physical training instructor for the local Air Training Corps. Lawless appeared at full back in the first 12 matches of the season but, just as at Aldershot, a defensive mistake against Port Vale cost him his place in the side. He returned to the side in January 1959, but was injured in his third game back. In February, he asked for a transfer because he was hoping to find a player-manager role.

He took a player-coach position at Welsh League club Ton Pentre while teaching in Hereford, but after a few months had to give it up because he was posted back to Southport. In May 1960, Lawless became player-manager of Loughborough United. He led Loughborough to runners-up in the Central Alliance and to the first round proper of the 1960–61 FA Cup: they drew with King's Lynn, but lost the replay, in which Lawless could not play because he was suspended after being sent off in the previous round. The club then joined the Midland League, and Lawless's contract was terminated in November 1961, not because of failings in his play or his management but because, in the opinion of the committee, his recent sending-off and suspension for use of abusive language brought the club into disrepute. From 1963 to 1966, he was player-manager of Stamford. He then moved on to another Midland League club, Sutton Town, where he was given full charge of all team-related matters, but resigned the following January, "tired of the frustrating struggle to gain players of the right standard."

Lawless died in Radcliffe-on-Trent, Nottinghamshire, in 2018 at the age of 85.
