= 1967–68 Midland Football League =

Midland Football League
- Season: 1967–68
- Champions: Ilkeston Town
- Promoted: Gainsborough Trinity; Goole Town; Scarborough; Worksop Town
- Matches: 420
- Goals: 1,409 (3.35 per match)

The 1967–68 Midland Football League season was the 68th in the history of the Midland Football League, a football competition in England.

== Clubs ==
The league featured 21 clubs which competed in the previous season, no new clubs joined the division this season.

== League table ==
Pos	Team	Pld	W	D	L	GF	GA	GR	Pts	Qualification or relegation
1	Ilkeston Town	40	22	11	7	66	35	1.886	55	
2	Heanor Town	40	25	5	10	90	51	1.765	55	
3	Arnold	40	20	12	8	100	62	1.613	52	
4	Gainsborough Trinity	40	21	9	10	80	47	1.702	51	Founder members of the Northern Premier League
5	Goole Town	40	19	10	11	71	61	1.164	48	Founder members of the Northern Premier League
6	Grantham	40	19	10	11	79	68	1.162	48	
7	Scarborough	40	21	4	15	67	52	1.288	46	Founder members of the Northern Premier League
8	Long Eaton United	40	17	11	12	48	36	1.333	45	
9	Worksop Town	40	16	13	11	76	68	1.118	45	Founder members of the Northern Premier League
10	Alfreton Town	40	18	6	16	84	71	1.183	42	
11	Matlock Town	40	18	6	16	74	71	1.042	42	
12	Sutton Town	40	15	11	14	64	60	1.067	41	
13	Lockheed Leamington	40	16	6	18	66	69	0.957	38	
14	Retford Town	40	14	7	19	70	64	1.094	35	
15	Belper Town	40	13	9	18	70	69	1.014	35	
16	Grimsby Town reserves	40	10	11	19	53	61	0.869	31	Resigned from the league
17	Stamford	40	11	9	20	53	89	0.596	31	
18	Scunthorpe United reserves	40	10	10	20	49	90	0.544	30	Resigned from the league
19	Skegness Town	40	9	9	22	56	94	0.596	27	
20	Loughborough United	40	6	13	21	43	78	0.551	25	
21	Spalding United	40	6	6	28	50	113	0.442	18	Transferred to the United Counties League

Source: nonleaguematters
Rules for classification: 1) points; 2) goal difference; 3) number of goals scored.
The points system until the 1990–91 season: 2 points for a win, 1 point for a draw and 0 points for losing.
