= 1966–67 Midland Football League =

Midland Football League
- Season: 1966–67
- Champions: Gainsborough Trinity
- Matches: 462
- Goals: 1,768 (3.83 per match)

The 1966–67 Midland Football League season was the 67th in the history of the Midland Football League, a football competition in England.

== Clubs ==
The league featured 21 clubs which competed in the previous season, along with one new club:

- Grimsby Town reserves

== League table ==
Pos	Team	Pld	W	D	L	GF	GA	GR	Pts	Qualification or relegation
1	Gainsborough Trinity	42	30	5	7	105	42	2.500	65	
2	Worksop Town	42	30	5	7	102	52	1.962	65	
3	Grantham	42	26	5	11	106	68	1.559	57	
4	Arnold	42	24	6	12	106	68	1.559	54	
5	Lockheed Leamington	42	23	6	13	105	80	1.313	52	
6	Scarborough	42	22	7	13	89	59	1.508	51	
7	Heanor Town	42	21	7	14	97	65	1.492	49	
8	Alfreton Town	42	20	7	15	77	74	1.041	47	
9	Goole Town	42	18	10	14	87	66	1.318	46	
10	Ilkeston Town	42	20	5	17	97	83	1.169	45	
11	Spalding United	42	19	6	17	86	82	1.049	44	
12	Retford Town	42	15	9	18	76	82	0.927	39	
13	Long Eaton United	42	11	14	17	51	68	0.750	36	
14	Skegness Town	42	13	8	21	74	111	0.667	34	
15	Grimsby Town reserves	42	14	5	23	76	83	0.916	33	
16	Matlock Town	42	13	7	22	60	90	0.667	33	
17	Belper Town	42	11	10	21	55	79	0.696	32	
18	Lincoln City reserves	42	11	10	21	65	92	0.707	32	Resigned from the league
19	Stamford	42	10	9	23	64	127	0.504	29	
20	Sutton Town	42	10	8	24	55	93	0.591	28	
21	Scunthorpe United reserves	42	12	3	27	69	99	0.697	27	
22	Loughborough United	42	8	10	24	66	105	0.629	26	

Source: nonleaguematters
Rules for classification: 1) points; 2) goal difference; 3) number of goals scored.
The points system until the 1990–91 season: 2 points for a win, 1 point for a draw and 0 points for losing.
