= 1965–66 Midland Football League =

Midland Football League
- Season: 1965–66
- Champions: Worksop Town
- Matches: 462
- Goals: 1,955 (4.23 per match)

The 1965–66 Midland Football League season was the 66th in the history of the Midland Football League, a football competition in England.

== Clubs ==
The league featured 20 clubs which competed in the previous season, along with two new clubs, joined from the North Regional League:

- Lincoln City reserves
- Scunthorpe United reserves

== League table ==
Pos	Team	Pld	W	D	L	GF	GA	GR	Pts	Qualification or relegation
1	Worksop Town	42	28	7	7	155	71	2.183	63	
2	Heanor Town	42	27	5	10	112	59	1.898	59	
3	Grantham	42	26	7	9	115	63	1.825	59	
4	Ilkeston Town	42	24	9	9	115	71	1.620	57	
5	Lockheed Leamington	42	21	12	9	126	81	1.556	54	
6	Gainsborough Trinity	42	23	5	14	80	64	1.250	51	
7	Arnold	42	20	10	12	104	90	1.156	50	
8	Retford Town	42	20	6	16	93	86	1.081	46	
9	Goole Town	42	19	7	16	95	75	1.267	45	
10	Alfreton Town	42	19	7	16	100	87	1.149	45	
11	Scarborough	42	19	7	16	89	80	1.113	45	
12	Scunthorpe United reserves	42	16	8	18	93	90	1.033	40	
13	Belper Town	42	17	6	19	82	91	0.901	40	
14	Matlock Town	42	14	11	17	63	81	0.778	39	
15	Loughborough United	42	13	11	18	84	93	0.903	37	
16	Lincoln City reserves	42	12	7	23	83	119	0.697	31	
17	Ashton United	42	12	7	23	75	108	0.694	31	Transferred to the Lancashire Combination
18	Stamford	42	11	8	23	66	110	0.600	30	
19	Long Eaton United	42	9	11	22	49	90	0.544	29	
20	Spalding United	42	10	9	23	51	97	0.526	29	
21	Sutton Town	42	10	8	24	61	97	0.629	28	
22	Skegness Town	42	7	2	33	64	152	0.421	16	

Source: nonleaguematters
Rules for classification: 1) points; 2) goal difference; 3) number of goals scored.
The points system until the 1990–91 season: 2 points for a win, 1 point for a draw and 0 points for losing.
