= 1969–70 Midland Football League =

Midland Football League
- Season: 1969–70
- Champions: Alfreton Town
- Matches: 306
- Goals: 1,100 (3.59 per match)

The 1969–70 Midland Football League season was the 70th in the history of the Midland Football League, a football competition in England.

== Clubs ==
The league featured 17 clubs which competed in the previous season, along with one new club:

- Worksop Town, relegated from the Northern Premier League

== League table ==
Pos	Team	Pld	W	D	L	GF	GA	GR	Pts	Qualification or relegation
1	Alfreton Town	34	30	3	1	119	19	6.263	63	
2	Grantham	34	21	7	6	81	40	2.025	49	
3	Arnold	34	18	9	7	80	48	1.667	45	
4	Ashby Institute	34	17	11	6	59	42	1.405	45	
5	Sutton Town	34	18	7	9	66	34	1.941	43	
6	Worksop Town	34	17	6	11	76	45	1.689	40	
7	Ilkeston Town	34	17	5	12	65	51	1.275	39	
8	Heanor Town	34	17	3	14	73	53	1.377	37	
9	Lockheed Leamington	34	16	4	14	65	59	1.102	36	
10	Retford Town	34	16	3	15	65	65	1.000	35	
11	Skegness Town	34	13	8	13	54	44	1.227	34	
12	Stamford	34	13	4	17	63	79	0.797	30	
13	Warley	34	8	7	19	37	81	0.457	23	
14	Boston	34	8	6	20	32	72	0.444	22	
15	Loughborough United	34	9	3	22	51	93	0.548	21	
16	Long Eaton United	34	5	10	19	45	79	0.570	20	
17	Barton Town	34	7	4	23	38	92	0.413	18	Transferred to the Yorkshire Football League
18	Belper Town	34	4	4	26	31	104	0.298	12	

Source: nonleaguematters
Rules for classification: 1) points; 2) goal difference; 3) number of goals scored.
The points system until the 1990–91 season: 2 points for a win, 1 point for a draw and 0 points for losing.
