= 1976–77 FA Cup qualifying rounds =

Tournament details
- Country: England; Wales

The FA Cup 1976–77 is the 96th season of the world's oldest football knockout competition; The Football Association Challenge Cup, or FA Cup for short. The large number of clubs entering the tournament from lower down the English football league system meant that the competition started with a number of preliminary and qualifying rounds. The 28 victorious teams from the fourth round qualifying progressed to the first round proper.

== Preliminary round ==
=== Ties ===
Tie	Home team	Score	Away team
1	A P Leamington	1–0	Moor Green
2	Clevedon Town	1–1	Weston Super Mare
3	Congleton Town	1–2	Worksop Town
4	Crook Town	4–1	Eppleton Colliery Welfare
5	Croydon	1–0	Guildford & Dorking United
6	Darwen	3–1	Radcliffe Borough
7	Dudley Town	3–1	Halesowen Town
8	Dunstable	0–4	Witney Town
9	Eastwood Hanley	2–2	Heanor Town
10	Edmonton & Haringey	0–1	Kingstonian
11	Enfield	1–0	Hampton
12	Evenwood Town	1–1	Lancaster City
13	Everwarm	0–1	Llanelli
14	Farnborough Town	4–0	Salisbury
15	Feltham	0–1	Hornchurch
16	Frecheville Community	0–1	Winterton Rangers
17	Friar Lane Old Boys	2–0	Warley County Borough
18	Frickley Athletic	3–0	Yorkshire Amateur
19	Glastonbury	1–0	Barry Town
20	Gloucester City	1–1	Trowbridge Town
21	Harrow Borough	3–1	Willesden
22	Harwich & Parkeston	4–2	Thetford Town
23	Hayes	2–0	Leyton Wingate
24	Herne Bay	4–1	Whitstable Town
25	Hertford Town	1–1	Romford
26	Hinckley Athletic	0–1	Tividale
27	Horden Colliery Welfare	2–3	Wingate (Durham)
28	Horsham Y M C A	2–0	Worthing
29	Hyde United	2–1	Leek Town
30	Kidderminster Harriers	1–2	Redditch United
31	Letchworth Garden City	5–1	Maidenhead United
32	Louth United	2–2	Wisbech Town
33	March Town United	0–3	Stowmarket
34	Margate	2–2	Sittingbourne
35	Marlow	0–0	Milton Keynes City
36	Medway	3–3	Rainham Town
37	Molesey	2–1	St Albans City
38	New Brighton	1–1	Skelmersdale United
39	Newport I O W	2–0	Wigmore Athletic
40	North Shields	0–0	Spennymoor United
41	Nuneaton Borough	2–1	Racing Club Warwick
42	Penzance	2–7	Yeovil Town
43	Prescot Town	4–1	St Helens Town
44	Ruislip Manor	2–2	Wokingham Town
45	Rushden Town	1–0	Wolverton Town & B R
46	South Liverpool	0–4	Winsford United
47	Stalybridge Celtic	1–3	Witton Albion
48	Washington	3–1	West Auckland Town

=== Replays ===
Tie	Home team	Score	Away team
2	Weston Super Mare	3–0	Clevedon Town
9	Heanor Town	2–0	Eastwood Hanley
12	Lancaster City	4–0	Evenwood Town
20	Trowbridge Town	1–2	Gloucester City
25	Romford	1–2	Hertford Town
32	Wisbech Town	2–0	Louth United
34	Sittingbourne	0–1	Margate
35	Milton Keynes City	0–1	Marlow
36	Rainham Town	2–1	Medway
38	Skelmersdale United	0–2	New Brighton
40	Spennymoor United	4–1	North Shields
44	Wokingham Town	3–1	Ruislip Manor

== 1st qualifying round ==
=== Ties ===
Tie	Home team	Score	Away team
1	Accrington Stanley	5–0	Bacup Borough
2	Alfreton Town	2–0	Belper Town
3	Alton Town	1–0	Andover
4	Ammanford Town	1–0	Evesham United (Replay ordered)
5	Annfield Plain	3–2	Billingham Synthonia
6	Appleby Frodingham	5–3	Bridlington Town
7	Armitage	2–1	Bedworth United
8	Arnold	1–0	Atherstone Town
9	Ashford Town (Kent)	1–0	Canterbury City
10	Aylesbury United	1–3	Banbury United
11	Bangor City	6–0	Prescot Town
12	Barking	6–1	Chertsey Town
13	Barnet	6–1	Egham Town
14	Barnstaple Town	2–1	Bath City
15	Barton Rovers	3–0	Cambridge City
16	Barton Town	2–2	Brigg Town
17	Basingstoke Town	10–0	Chichester City
18	Bedford Town	7–1	Chatteris Town
19	Bethesda Athletic	2–1	Oswestry Town
20	Bexhill Town	2–1	Bognor Regis Town
21	Boston	2–0	Bourne Town
22	Bridgwater Town	2–4	Falmouth Town
23	Bridport	2–4	Minehead
24	Burton Albion	1–1	Eastwood Town
25	Bury Town	2–1	Clacton Town (@ Clacton Town)
26	Camberley Town	1–1	Epsom & Ewell
27	Chippenham Town	1–3	Devizes Town
28	Cinderford Town	1–1	Melksham Town
29	Clitheroe	0–0	Formby
30	Consett	1–0	Easington Colliery Welfare
31	Corinthian Casuals	0–1	Grays Athletic
32	Cray Wanderers	2–2	Erith & Belvedere
33	Dagenham w/o-scr Stevenage Athletic		
34	Darlaston	2–1	Highgate United
35	Desborough Town	0–1	Enderby Town
36	Didcot Town	1–0	Oxford City
37	Dover	3–1	Eastbourne United
38	Droylsden	3–2	Glossop
39	Dulwich Hamlet	0–0	Hemel Hempstead
40	Eastbourne Town	0–3	Lewes
41	Emley	4–1	Gainsborough Trinity
42	Epping Town	3–2	Hoddesdon Town
43	Fareham Town	1–1	Gosport Borough
44	Farsley Celtic	1–4	Goole Town
45	Ferryhill Athletic	0–1	Netherfield
46	Frome Town	1–5	Mangotsfield United
47	Gorleston	1–1	Lowestoft Town
48	Gornal Athletic	1–3	Lye Town
49	Gravesend & Northfleet	0–0	Maidstone United
50	Great Harwood	1–1	Darwen
51	Harlow Town	2–2	Hillingdon Borough
52	Hastings United	5–0	Peacehaven & Telscombe
53	Hatfield Town	2–0	Hounslow
54	Haywards Heath	3–1	Ringmer
55	Heaton Stannington	0–3	Shildon
56	Hednesford Town	1–0	Ilkeston Town
57	Hertford Town	1–2	Boreham Wood
58	Histon	1–4	Potton United
59	Horsham	4–0	Selsey
60	Horwich R M I	1–1	Worksop Town
61	Hungerford Town	0–3	Farnborough Town
62	Hyde United	4–1	Ashton United
63	Irthlingborough Diamonds	2–2	Soham Town Rangers
64	King's Lynn	3–2	Parson Drove United
65	Lancaster City	1–1	Bishop Auckland
66	Letchworth Garden City	1–0	Addlestone
67	Leytonstone	2–0	Harrow Borough
68	Littlehampton Town	0–1	Horsham Y M C A
69	Llanelli	2–1	Calne Town
70	Long Eaton United	3–0	Heanor Town
71	Marlow	1–2	Carshalton Athletic
72	Merthyr Tydfil	4–1	Gloucester City
73	Metropolitan Police	0–3	Sutton United
74	Mexborough Town	2–0	Frickley Athletic
75	Molesey	2–1	Burnham
76	Mossley	5–2	Chorley
77	Nantwich Town	0–1	Northwich Victoria
78	New Mills	5–2	Brereton Social
79	Newmarket Town	1–1	Harwich & Parkeston
80	Newquay	0–0	St Blazey
81	Nuneaton Borough	2–0	Brierley Hill Alliance
82	Oldbury United	0–4	Tividale
83	Penrith	0–2	Crook Town
84	Poole Town	2–0	Dorchester Town
85	Porthmadog	3–4	New Brighton
86	Prestwich Heys	0–1	Runcorn
87	Rainham Town	1–2	Aveley
88	Ramsgate	2–1	Herne Bay
89	Redditch United	2–0	Alvechurch
90	Redhill	0–1	Bromley
91	Retford Town	0–3	Winterton Rangers
92	Rhyl	1–1	Macclesfield Town
93	Rossendale United	0–5	Buxton
94	Rothwell Town	0–0	A P Leamington
95	Selby Town	0–2	Bridlington Trinity
96	Sheppey United	2–2	Margate
97	Sidley United	0–3	Folkestone & Shepway
98	Skegness Town	0–2	Wisbech Town
99	Slough Town	2–2	Finchley
100	South Bank	3–0	Carlisle City
101	Southall & Ealing Borough	2–1	Hornchurch
102	Southwick	2–0	Deal Town
103	Spalding United	0–3	Corby Town
104	St Neots Town	1–0	Stowmarket
105	Staines Town	3–1	Hayes
106	Stamford	3–2	Holbeach United
107	Stourbridge	1–3	Bromsgrove Rovers
108	Stratford Town	0–2	Dudley Town
109	Sudbury Town	1–1	Great Yarmouth Town
110	Sutton Coldfield Town	3–0	Friar Lane Old Boys
111	Sutton Town	0–1	Denaby United
112	Swaythling	4–0	Newport I O W
113	Tamworth	1–1	Coventry Sporting
114	Taunton Town	1–0	Weston Super Mare
115	Telford United	3–1	Gresley Rovers
116	Thame United	1–0	Witney Town
117	Three Bridges	3–3	Faversham Town
118	Tilbury	2–2	Enfield
119	Tiverton Town	0–2	Yeovil Town
120	Ton Pentre	1–1	Cheltenham Town
121	Tonbridge	0–1	Croydon
122	Tow Law Town	3–1	Wingate (Durham)
123	Tring Town	0–3	Chesham United
124	Tunbridge Wells	2–0	Crawley Town
125	Uxbridge	0–1	Bracknell Town
126	V S Rugby	1–4	Bilston
127	Vauxhall Motors	0–0	Rushden Town
128	Wadebridge Town	1–1	Ilminster Town
129	Walthamstow Avenue	1–4	Kingstonian
130	Ware	2–0	Edgware Town
131	Washington	0–2	Barrow
132	Waterlooville	9–0	Cowes
133	Wealdstone	5–1	Clapton
134	Wellingborough Town	3–1	Ely City
135	Welton Rovers	1–2	Bideford
136	Wembley	1–1	Wokingham Town
137	Whitby Town	3–0	Spennymoor United
138	Whitley Bay	5–0	Boldon Community Association
139	Willington	3–3	Durham City
140	Windsor & Eton	3–2	Cheshunt
141	Winsford United	0–0	Burscough
142	Witton Albion	3–1	Curzon Ashton
143	Woking	3–1	Burgess Hill Town
144	Worcester City	3–2	Glastonbury

=== Replays ===
Tie	Home team	Score	Away team
4	Ammanford Town	1–5	Evesham United
16	Brigg Town	3–2	Barton Town
24	Eastwood Town	1–2	Burton Albion
26	Epsom & Ewell	1–0	Camberley Town
28	Melksham Town	0–1	Cinderford Town
29	Formby	3–1	Clitheroe
32	Erith & Belvedere	2–3	Cray Wanderers
39	Hemel Hempstead	1–2	Dulwich Hamlet
43	Gosport Borough	0–5	Fareham Town
47	Lowestoft Town	2–0	Gorleston
49	Maidstone United	3–0	Gravesend & Northfleet
50	Darwen	0–3	Great Harwood
51	Hillingdon Borough	2–0	Harlow Town
60	Worksop Town	1–0	Horwich R M I
63	Soham Town Rangers	4–3	Irthlingborough Diamonds
65	Bishop Auckland	2–0	Lancaster City
79	Harwich & Parkeston	8–1	Newmarket Town
80	St Blazey	1–3	Newquay
92	Macclesfield Town	1–2	Rhyl
94	A P Leamington	2–0	Rothwell Town
96	Margate	2–0	Sheppey United
99	Finchley	0–4	Slough Town
109	Great Yarmouth Town	0–1	Sudbury Town
113	Coventry Sporting	2–0	Tamworth
117	Faversham Town	2–1	Three Bridges
118	Enfield	3–1	Tilbury
120	Cheltenham Town	4–0	Ton Pentre
127	Rushden Town	1–2	Vauxhall Motors
128	Ilminster Town	1–0	Wadebridge Town
136	Wokingham Town	1–1	Wembley
139	Durham City	3–3	Willington
141	Burscough	1–3	Winsford United

=== 2nd replays ===
Tie	Home team	Score	Away team
136	Wembley	0–1	Wokingham Town
139	Willington	2–3	Durham City

== 2nd qualifying round ==
=== Ties ===
Tie	Home team	Score	Away team
1	A P Leamington	1–1	Bromsgrove Rovers
2	Accrington Stanley	0–3	Formby
3	Alfreton Town	0–1	Droylsden
4	Alton Town	0–0	Fareham Town
5	Annfield Plain	1–1	Netherfield
6	Appleby Frodingham	0–0	Goole Town
7	Armitage	1–1	Darlaston
8	Arnold	0–0	Hednesford Town
9	Ashford Town (Kent)	0–1	Hastings United
10	Aveley	1–0	Grays Athletic
11	Banbury United	3–2	Didcot Town
12	Bangor City	4–2	Bethesda Athletic
13	Barking	1–1	Sutton United
14	Barnet	3–0	Hatfield Town
15	Barnstaple Town	1–2	Minehead
16	Barrow	2–1	Shildon
17	Barton Rovers	5–0	Soham Town Rangers
18	Basingstoke Town	2–0	Horsham
19	Bedford Town	4–1	Potton United
20	Bexhill Town	0–3	Lewes
21	Bishop Auckland	3–0	Consett
22	Boreham Wood	1–1	Epsom & Ewell
23	Boston	2–1	King's Lynn
24	Brigg Town	1–2	Emley
25	Bromley	2–0	Faversham Town
26	Bury Town	2–3	Lowestoft Town
27	Carshalton Athletic	1–1	Epping Town
28	Cray Wanderers	2–1	Maidstone United
29	Crook Town	1–0	South Bank
30	Croydon	0–0	Woking
31	Devizes Town	0–1	Mangotsfield United
32	Dover	2–0	Haywards Heath
33	Dudley Town	4–1	Bilston
34	Enfield	5–2	Bracknell Town
35	Falmouth Town	8–0	Newquay
36	Farnborough Town	1–1	Poole Town
37	Great Harwood	6–0	Mossley
38	Harwich & Parkeston	3–1	Sudbury Town
39	Horsham Y M C A	1–1	Tunbridge Wells
40	Hyde United	0–1	Burton Albion
41	Kingstonian	0–2	Wealdstone
42	Letchworth Garden City	0–1	Dulwich Hamlet
43	Leytonstone	1–1	Slough Town
44	Llanelli	3–2	Cinderford Town
45	Long Eaton United	3–0	New Mills
46	Margate	2–2	Folkestone & Shepway
47	Merthyr Tydfil	3–3	Cheltenham Town
48	Mexborough Town	3–2	Bridlington Trinity
49	Molesey	1–1	Hillingdon Borough
50	New Brighton	1–3	Rhyl
51	Nuneaton Borough	2–0	Lye Town
52	Ramsgate	1–1	Southwick
53	Redditch United	0–0	Enderby Town
54	Southall & Ealing Borough	0–1	Dagenham
55	St Neots Town	3–0	Corby Town
56	Staines Town	3–1	Ware
57	Sutton Coldfield Town	2–1	Coventry Sporting
58	Swaythling	0–3	Waterlooville
59	Taunton Town	4–2	Bideford
60	Thame United	0–1	Chesham United
61	Tividale	0–3	Telford United
62	Tow Law Town	1–2	Durham City
63	Vauxhall Motors	1–3	Wellingborough Town
64	Whitby Town	2–0	Whitley Bay
65	Winsford United	1–0	Runcorn
66	Winterton Rangers	2–1	Denaby United
67	Wisbech Town	1–1	Stamford
68	Witton Albion	1–3	Northwich Victoria
69	Wokingham Town	2–1	Windsor & Eton
70	Worcester City	3–1	Evesham United
71	Worksop Town	3–0	Buxton
72	Yeovil Town	10–1	Ilminster Town

=== Replays ===
Tie	Home team	Score	Away team
1	Bromsgrove Rovers	2–1	A P Leamington
4	Fareham Town	1–0	Alton Town
5	Netherfield	6–0	Annfield Plain
6	Goole Town	1–0	Appleby Frodingham
7	Darlaston	1–0	Armitage
8	Hednesford Town	3–0	Arnold
13	Sutton United	1–4	Barking
22	Epsom & Ewell	2–1	Boreham Wood
27	Epping Town	1–1	Carshalton Athletic
30	Woking	2–0	Croydon
36	Poole Town	3–1	Farnborough Town
39	Tunbridge Wells	0–3	Horsham Y M C A (Ordered to be replayed)
39	Tunbridge Wells	0–2	Horsham Y M C A
43	Slough Town	1–0	Leytonstone
46	Folkestone & Shepway	2–4	Margate (Ordered to be replayed)
46	Folkestone & Shepway	3–4	Margate
47	Cheltenham Town	1–1	Merthyr Tydfil
49	Hillingdon Borough	2–1	Molesey
52	Southwick	1–2	Ramsgate
53	Enderby Town	1–0	Redditch United
67	Stamford	3–0	Wisbech Town

=== 2nd replays ===
Tie	Home team	Score	Away team
27	Carshalton Athletic	4–2	Epping Town
47	Merthyr Tydfil	4–0	Cheltenham Town

== 3rd qualifying round ==
=== Ties ===
Tie	Home team	Score	Away team
1	Aveley	1–1	Woking
2	Banbury United	1–4	Chesham United
3	Barking	3–1	Wokingham Town
4	Barnet	0–1	Slough Town
5	Barrow	2–2	Whitby Town
6	Barton Rovers	1–1	Wellingborough Town
7	Basingstoke Town	1–2	Waterlooville
8	Bedford Town	3–0	St Neots Town
9	Bishop Auckland	1–1	Crook Town
10	Boston	1–0	Stamford
11	Burton Albion	5–0	Long Eaton United
12	Carshalton Athletic	3–3	Dagenham
13	Cray Wanderers	0–2	Bromley
14	Darlaston	1–0	Sutton Coldfield Town
15	Dover	3–2	Margate
16	Droylsden	1–0	Worksop Town
17	Dulwich Hamlet	0–2	Wealdstone
18	Emley	4–7	Winterton Rangers
19	Enderby Town	0–1	Dudley Town
20	Epsom & Ewell	1–1	Enfield
21	Falmouth Town	2–0	Yeovil Town
22	Fareham Town	0–1	Poole Town
23	Formby	0–0	Great Harwood
24	Goole Town	7–1	Mexborough Town
25	Hastings United	2–0	Ramsgate
26	Hednesford Town	0–0	Telford United
27	Hillingdon Borough	2–0	Staines Town
28	Lewes	4–4	Horsham Y M C A
29	Llanelli	3–6	Merthyr Tydfil
30	Lowestoft Town	0–3	Harwich & Parkeston
31	Mangotsfield United	0–2	Worcester City
32	Minehead	2–1	Taunton Town
33	Netherfield	1–1	Durham City
34	Northwich Victoria	0–0	Rhyl
35	Nuneaton Borough	2–0	Bromsgrove Rovers
36	Winsford United	1–1	Bangor City

=== Replays ===
Tie	Home team	Score	Away team
1	Woking	4–0	Aveley
5	Whitby Town	3–4	Barrow
6	Wellingborough Town	1–2	Barton Rovers
9	Crook Town	1–0	Bishop Auckland
12	Dagenham	2–1	Carshalton Athletic
20	Enfield	1–0	Epsom & Ewell
23	Great Harwood	3–0	Formby
26	Telford United	3–0	Hednesford Town
28	Horsham Y M C A	2–4	Lewes
33	Durham City	1–2	Netherfield
34	Rhyl	1–3	Northwich Victoria
36	Bangor City	4–1	Winsford United

== 4th qualifying round ==
The teams that given byes to this round are Matlock Town, Altrincham, Morecambe, Dartford, Bishop's Stortford, Ilford, Walton & Hersham, Hendon, Gateshead United, Chelmsford City, Grantham, Boston United, Blyth Spartans, Kettering Town, Weymouth, Wycombe Wanderers, Leatherhead, Hitchin Town, Tooting & Mitcham United and Marine.

=== Ties ===
Tie	Home team	Score	Away team
1	Altrincham	1–0	Grantham
2	Barton Rovers	2–3	Nuneaton Borough
3	Blyth Spartans	0–3	Gateshead United
4	Boston	1–0	Bangor City
5	Bromley	9–3	Walton & Hersham
6	Burton Albion	0–1	Northwich Victoria
7	Chelmsford City	0–4	Leatherhead
8	Chesham United	4–2	Worcester City
9	Crook Town	2–1	Netherfield
10	Dagenham	1–1	Dartford
11	Darlaston	1–1	Kettering Town
12	Dover	2–2	Hitchin Town
13	Dudley Town	1–0	Bedford Town
14	Enfield	2–2	Ilford
15	Falmouth Town	1–1	Minehead
16	Goole Town	1–1	Boston United
17	Hillingdon Borough	2–1	Hastings United
18	Lewes	1–1	Harwich & Parkeston
19	Marine	1–1	Barrow
20	Morecambe	2–0	Great Harwood
21	Poole Town	2–3	Weymouth
22	Telford United	2–5	Matlock Town
23	Tooting & Mitcham United	1–1	Barking
24	Waterlooville	4–1	Hendon
25	Wealdstone	3–2	Bishop's Stortford
26	Winterton Rangers	3–3	Droylsden
27	Woking	0–0	Slough Town
28	Wycombe Wanderers	3–1	Merthyr Tydfil

=== Replays ===
Tie	Home team	Score	Away team
10	Dartford	3–2	Dagenham
11	Kettering Town	2–0	Darlaston
12	Hitchin Town	3–1	Dover
14	Ilford	0–4	Enfield
15	Minehead	3–0	Falmouth Town
16	Boston United	1–3	Goole Town
18	Harwich & Parkeston	3–1	Lewes
19	Barrow	3–1	Marine
23	Barking	1–2	Tooting & Mitcham United
26	Droylsden	3–2	Winterton Rangers
27	Slough Town	0–1	Woking

== 1976–77 FA Cup ==
See 1976–77 FA Cup for details of the rounds from the first round proper onwards.
