= 1967–68 FA Cup qualifying rounds =

Tournament details
- Country: England; Wales

The FA Cup 1967–68 is the 87th season of the world's oldest football knockout competition; The Football Association Challenge Cup, or FA Cup for short. The large number of clubs entering the tournament from lower down the English football league system meant that the competition started with a number of preliminary and qualifying rounds. The 30 victorious teams from the fourth round qualifying progressed to the first round proper.

== Preliminary round ==
=== Ties ===
Tie	Home team	Score	Away team
1	Horden Colliery Welfare	1–0	North Shields
2	Rugby Town	3–0	Loughborough United
3	Spennymoor United	5–0	Boldon Colliery Welfare
4	Stafford Rangers	0–1	Lower Gornal Athletic
5	Stamford	0–4	St Neots Town
6	Stonehouse	0–6	Merthyr Tydfil
7	Tamworth	5–1	Sutton Town
8	Thetford Town	2–2	Sudbury Town
9	Thorne Colliery	3–4	Selby Town
10	Wellingborough Town	3–1	Soham Town Rangers
11	Wembley	2–0	Wealdstone
12	Wisbech Town	1–1	Spalding United
13	Yorkshire Amateur	1–0	Worksop Town

=== Replays ===
Tie	Home team	Score	Away team
8	Sudbury Town	2–0	Thetford Town
12	Spalding United	2–3	Wisbech Town

== 1st qualifying round ==
=== Ties ===
Tie	Home team	Score	Away team
1	Abergavenny Thursdays	0–2	Llanelli
2	Alfreton Town	1–2	Matlock Town
3	Annfield Plain	2–2	West Auckland Town
4	Arnold	3–0	Heanor Town
5	Ashington	3–2	Horden Colliery Welfare
6	Atherstone Town	2–0	Belper Town
7	Aylesbury United	2–2	Maidenhead United
8	Banbury United	2–0	Dunstable Town
9	Bangor City	6–0	Pwllheli & District
10	Barnet	3–2	Walton & Hersham
11	Barry Town	1–0	Cinderford Town
12	Barton Town	5–2	Hull Brunswick
13	Basingstoke Town	5–1	Woking
14	Bedworth Town	2–0	Rugby Town
15	Bexley United	2–0	Tilbury
16	Bideford	3–2	St Blazey
17	Biggleswade & District	1–1	Rothwell Town
18	Billingham Synthonia	2–6	Whitby Town
19	Bilston	0–1	Dudley Town
20	Bletchley Town	3–4	Wembley
21	Boston	0–0	Louth United
22	Boston United	1–1	Holbeach United
23	Bourne Town	4–0	Wisbech Town
24	Bridlington Town	0–0	Brigg Town
25	Bridlington Trinity	1–2	Selby Town
26	Brierley Hill Alliance	1–1	Burton Albion
27	Bromsgrove Rovers	2–0	Lower Gornal Athletic
28	Bury Town	2–1	Harwich & Parkeston
29	Buxton	4–6	Eastwood Hanley
30	Cambridge City	4–0	Desborough Town
31	Cambridge United	6–0	March Town United
32	Canterbury City	1–2	Tonbridge
33	Carshalton Athletic	2–2	Staines Town
34	Chatham Town	4–2	Maidstone United
35	Chatteris Town	1–2	St Neots Town
36	Cheltenham Town	2–1	Merthyr Tydfil
37	Chesham United	0–3	Leytonstone
38	Cheshunt	4–4	Erith & Belvedere
39	Chichester City	2–0	Dorking
40	Chorley	1–1	St Helens Town
41	Clacton Town	3–2	Gothic
42	Clapton	2–1	Leatherhead
43	Congleton Town	0–5	Tamworth
44	Consett	1–2	Crook Town
45	Cowes	2–1	Thornycroft Athletic
46	Crawley Town	1–0	Alton Town
47	Crittall Athletic	3–0	Vauxhall Motors
48	Croydon Amateurs	0–1	Hayes
49	Dagenham	1–0	Redhill
50	Dartford	4–0	Gravesend & Northfleet
51	Darwen	0–2	Ellesmere Port Town
52	Deal Town	2–0	Sheppey United
53	Denaby United	4–0	Ossett Albion
54	Devizes Town	0–4	Poole Town
55	Dorchester Town	1–0	Glastonbury
56	Dover	4–0	Bromley
57	Droylsden	1–1	Burscough
58	Dulwich Hamlet	2–1	Amersham Town
59	Eastbourne	1–1	Littlehampton Town
60	Eastbourne United	2–0	Horsham
61	Ely City	5–1	Haverhill Rovers
62	Epsom & Ewell	1–3	Stevenage Town
63	Evenwood Town	0–6	Ryhope Colliery Welfare
64	Falmouth Town	4–1	Penzance
65	Fareham Town	2–2	Salisbury
66	Farsley Celtic	2–1	Gainsborough Trinity
67	Feltham	1–1	Hertford Town
68	Ferryhill Athletic	2–1	Bedlington Colliery Welfare
69	Finchley	0–1	Hoddesdon Town
70	Fleetwood	2–3	Netherfield
71	Ford United	1–2	Cray Wanderers
72	Frickley Colliery	5–0	Yorkshire Amateur
73	Frome Town	1–0	Trowbridge Town
74	Gateshead	1–1	Blyth Spartans
75	Gorleston	0–2	Sudbury Town
76	Great Harwood	3–1	Leyland Motors
77	Hampton	2–0	Southall
78	Harlow Town	0–2	Brentwood Town
79	Harrow Borough	1–0	Baldock Town
80	Hastings United	0–1	Margate
81	Hatfield Town	1–2	Bishop's Stortford
82	Haywards Heath	2–1	Bognor Regis Town
83	Hednesford Town	0–5	Wellington Town
84	Hemel Hempstead	1–0	Kingstonian
85	Herne Bay	0–2	Bexhill Town
86	Hillingdon Borough	4–0	Aveley
87	Hinckley Athletic	0–1	Darlaston
88	Holyhead Town	4–0	Porthmadog
89	Horwich R M I	3–1	Wigan Rovers
90	Huntley & Palmers	1–2	Barking
91	Hyde United	3–0	Mossley
92	Ilford	1–0	Grays Athletic
93	Lancaster City	3–0	Milnthorpe Corinthians
94	Linotype & Machinery	1–3	Runcorn
95	Lockheed Leamington	0–1	Stourbridge
96	Long Eaton United	2–0	Gresley Rovers
97	Lostock Gralam	1–1	New Brighton
98	Lovells Athletic	0–4	Gloucester City
99	Lowestoft Town	3–0	Great Yarmouth Town
100	Macclesfield Town	7–0	Bacup Borough
101	Marine	2–3	Oswestry Town
102	Marlow	3–1	Letchworth Town
103	Minehead	4–1	Street
104	Nantwich	1–2	Kirkby Town
105	Newmarket Town	0–1	Kettering Town
106	Newport I O W	4–3	Andover
107	Norton Woodseats	2–1	Ilkeston Town
108	Penrith	4–0	Nelson
109	Portland United	3–1	Bridport
110	Redditch	2–3	Halesowen Town
111	Retford Town	2–1	Mexborough Town
112	Rhyl	2–1	South Liverpool
113	Ruislip Manor	0–1	Hornchurch
114	Rushden Town	8–0	Histon
115	Scarborough	1–1	Goole Town
116	Shildon	3–3	Murton Colliery Welfare
117	Skegness Town	0–2	King's Lynn
118	Slough Town	3–0	Corinthian Casuals
119	Snowdown Colliery Welfare	0–4	Ramsgate Athletic
120	St Albans City	0–0	Hitchin Town
121	Stalybridge Celtic	1–1	Prescot Town
122	Stanley United	3–2	Whitley Bay
123	Stockton	0–3	Spennymoor United
124	Tooting & Mitcham United	1–3	Sutton United
125	Tow Law Town	5–1	South Bank
126	Uxbridge	3–1	Metropolitan Police
127	Wadebridge Town	7–1	Barnstaple Town
128	Walthamstow Avenue	2–0	Leyton
129	Ware	3–2	Hounslow
130	Warminster Town	0–9	Taunton
131	Waterlooville	2–2	Selsey
132	Wellingborough Town	4–0	Eynesbury Rovers
133	Westbury United	0–0	Chippenham Town
134	Whitstable Town	1–1	Sittingbourne
135	Willington	1–3	Durham City
136	Windsor & Eton	3–1	Malden Town
137	Winsford United	1–0	Northwich Victoria
138	Witton Albion	6–1	Rossendale United
139	Wokingham Town	2–1	Fleet Town
140	Wolverton Town & B R	4–1	Rainham Town
141	Worcester City	2–0	Stratford Town Amateurs
142	Worthing	0–1	Lancing

=== Replays ===
Tie	Home team	Score	Away team
3	West Auckland Town	2–0	Annfield Plain
7	Maidenhead United	4–2	Aylesbury United
17	Rothwell Town	5–2	Biggleswade & District
21	Louth United	4–0	Boston
22	Holbeach United	0–2	Boston United
24	Brigg Town	1–0	Bridlington Town
26	Burton Albion	2–1	Brierley Hill Alliance
33	Staines Town	1–1	Carshalton Athletic
38	Erith & Belvedere	4–3	Cheshunt
40	St Helens Town	0–3	Chorley
57	Burscough	5–2	Droylsden
59	Littlehampton Town	1–2	Eastbourne
65	Salisbury	5–1	Fareham Town
67	Hertford Town	8–0	Feltham
74	Blyth Spartans	2–1	Gateshead
97	New Brighton	1–2	Lostock Gralam
115	Goole Town	2–1	Scarborough
116	Murton Colliery Welfare	1–1	Shildon
120	Hitchin Town	3–1	St Albans City
121	Prescot Town	0–1	Stalybridge Celtic
131	Selsey	3–2	Waterlooville
133	Chippenham Town	3–2	Westbury United
134	Sittingbourne	3–3	Whitstable Town

=== 2nd replay ===
Tie	Home team	Score	Away team
33	Staines Town	2–3	Carshalton Athletic
116	Shildon	1–2	Murton Colliery Welfare
134	Whitstable Town	3–2	Sittingbourne

== 2nd qualifying round ==
=== Ties ===
Tie	Home team	Score	Away team
1	Arnold	2–1	Atherstone Town
2	Bangor City	3–1	Holyhead Town
3	Barnet	9–0	Clapton
4	Barton Town	3–3	Brigg Town
5	Basingstoke Town	3–4	Chichester City
6	Bexley United	1–2	Stevenage Town
7	Bideford	2–0	St Austell
8	Boston United	1–0	Louth United
9	Bury Town	3–2	Clacton Town
10	Cambridge United	3–1	Ely City
11	Carshalton Athletic	3–2	Hayes
12	Chorley	2–2	Ellesmere Port Town
13	Cowes	1–1	Salisbury
14	Crittall Athletic	2–0	Hoddesdon Town
15	Dagenham	2–1	Dartford
16	Darlaston	0–0	Bromsgrove Rovers
17	Deal Town	1–4	Margate
18	Denaby United	2–2	Farsley Celtic
19	Dorchester Town	4–1	Chippenham Town
20	Dudley Town	0–4	Burton Albion
21	Durham City	3–0	Murton Colliery Welfare
22	Eastbourne	2–0	Eastbourne United
23	Falmouth Town	6–0	Wadebridge Town
24	Ferryhill Athletic	0–0	Spennymoor United
25	Frome Town	1–1	Minehead
26	Gloucester City	0–1	Cheltenham Town
27	Goole Town	2–0	Selby Town
28	Hampton	3–2	Hemel Hempstead
29	Hitchin Town	3–1	Dulwich Hamlet
30	Hornchurch	2–4	Cray Wanderers
31	Horwich R M I	0–3	Hyde United
32	Kettering Town	1–1	Wellingborough Town
33	King's Lynn	3–1	Bourne Town
34	Lancing	1–1	Haywards Heath
35	Leytonstone	4–0	Erith & Belvedere
36	Llanelli	0–0	Barry Town
37	Long Eaton United	2–0	Bedworth Town
38	Lowestoft Town	3–1	Sudbury Town
39	Maidenhead United	1–3	Banbury United
40	Marlow	0–3	Wembley
41	Matlock Town	4–1	Eastwood Hanley
42	Netherfield	1–2	Great Harwood
43	Norton Woodseats	1–2	Tamworth
44	Penrith	0–3	Lancaster City
45	Poole Town	5–0	Melksham Town
46	Ramsgate Athletic	4–1	Bexhill Town
47	Retford Town	2–0	Frickley Colliery
48	Rhyl	4–0	Oswestry Town
49	Rothwell Town	1–7	Cambridge City
50	Runcorn	5–2	Lostock Gralam
51	Rushden Town	4–0	St Neots Town
52	Ryhope Colliery Welfare	1–0	Stanley United
53	Selsey	1–3	Newport I O W
54	Slough Town	3–0	Hertford Town
55	Stalybridge Celtic	1–1	Burscough
56	Sutton United	5–1	Hillingdon Borough
57	Taunton	2–0	Portland United
58	Tonbridge	2–1	Chatham Town
59	Tow Law Town	2–0	Crook Town
60	Uxbridge	1–4	Brentwood Town
61	Walthamstow Avenue	1–0	Ilford
62	Ware	4–1	Harrow Borough
63	Wellington Town	2–2	Stourbridge
64	West Auckland Town	0–1	Ashington
65	Whitby Town	2–0	Blyth Spartans
66	Whitstable Town	1–7	Dover
67	Windsor & Eton	2–1	Barking
68	Winsford United	3–0	Kirkby Town
69	Witton Albion	0–2	Macclesfield Town
70	Wokingham Town	1–5	Crawley Town
71	Wolverton Town & B R	1–3	Bishop's Stortford
72	Worcester City	1–1	Halesowen Town

=== Replays ===
Tie	Home team	Score	Away team
4	Brigg Town	2–2	Barton Town
12	Ellesmere Port Town	3–2	Chorley
13	Salisbury	5–1	Cowes
16	Bromsgrove Rovers	5–0	Darlaston
18	Farsley Celtic	3–1	Denaby United
24	Spennymoor United	4–2	Ferryhill Athletic
25	Minehead	2–1	Frome Town
32	Wellingborough Town	1–3	Kettering Town
34	Haywards Heath	1–1	Lancing
36	Barry Town	4–0	Llanelli
55	Burscough	3–1	Stalybridge Celtic
63	Stourbridge	1–0	Wellington Town
72	Halesowen Town	0–0	Worcester City

=== 2nd replays ===
Tie	Home team	Score	Away team
4	Barton Town	1–0	Brigg Town
34	Lancing	3–0	Haywards Heath
72	Worcester City	2–0	Halesowen Town

== 3rd qualifying round ==
=== Ties ===
Tie	Home team	Score	Away team
1	Arnold	1–0	Long Eaton United
2	Banbury United	3–2	Wembley
3	Bangor City	4–0	Rhyl
4	Barnet	7–1	Windsor & Eton
5	Barry Town	2–2	Cheltenham Town
6	Barton Town	1–1	Goole Town
7	Boston United	2–0	King's Lynn
8	Burton Albion	5–1	Bromsgrove Rovers
9	Bury Town	0–1	Lowestoft Town
10	Cambridge City	1–0	Rushden Town
11	Cambridge United	3–0	Kettering Town
12	Carshalton Athletic	0–2	Brentwood Town
13	Chichester City	1–0	Crawley Town
14	Crittall Athletic	1–2	Ware
15	Dagenham	1–0	Cray Wanderers
16	Dorchester Town	3–2	Poole Town
17	Eastbourne	4–0	Lancing
18	Ellesmere Port Town	3–2	Burscough
19	Falmouth Town	3–1	Bideford
20	Farsley Celtic	0–1	Retford Town
21	Great Harwood	3–1	Lancaster City
22	Hampton	4–5	Walthamstow Avenue
23	Hyde United	0–2	Macclesfield Town
24	Leytonstone	2–1	Hitchin Town
25	Margate	6–4	Ramsgate Athletic
26	Matlock Town	2–0	Tamworth
27	Minehead	2–2	Taunton
28	Runcorn	7–1	Winsford United
29	Ryhope Colliery Welfare	4–3	Durham City
30	Salisbury	3–0	Newport I O W
31	Slough Town	5–1	Bishop's Stortford
32	Stevenage Town	2–3	Sutton United
33	Stourbridge	4–0	Worcester City
34	Tonbridge	4–2	Dover
35	Tow Law Town	3–2	Ashington
36	Whitby Town	0–1	Spennymoor United

=== Replays ===
Tie	Home team	Score	Away team
5	Cheltenham Town	3–1	Barry Town
6	Goole Town	4–1	Barton Town
27	Taunton	1–2	Minehead

== 4th qualifying round ==
The teams that given byes to this round are Hendon, Wimbledon, Wycombe Wanderers, Yeovil Town, Hereford United, South Shields, Chelmsford City, Bath City, Weymouth, Romford, Bedford Town, Wigan Athletic, Corby Town, Folkestone, Guildford City, Grantham, Altrincham, Kidderminster Harriers, Nuneaton Borough, Oxford City, Bishop Auckland, Morecambe, Welton Rovers and Ashford Town (Kent).

=== Ties ===
Tie	Home team	Score	Away team
1	Arnold	4–2	Stourbridge
2	Bishop Auckland	2–2	Ryhope Colliery Welfare
3	Boston United	1–1	Bedford Town
4	Brentwood Town	1–3	Walthamstow Avenue
5	Burton Albion	1–4	Kidderminster Harriers
6	Chelmsford City	2–0	Banbury United
7	Corby Town	2–2	Cambridge City
8	Dorchester Town	1–2	Salisbury
9	Eastbourne	0–9	Margate
10	Ellesmere Port Town	1–2	Runcorn
11	Goole Town	2–0	Bangor City
12	Great Harwood	0–1	Altrincham
13	Guildford City	0–0	Chichester City
14	Hendon	1–2	Romford
15	Hereford United	3–2	Cheltenham Town
16	Lowestoft Town	2–2	Cambridge United
17	Minehead	1–2	Falmouth Town
18	Nuneaton Borough	1–0	Matlock Town
19	Retford Town	4–4	Grantham
20	Slough Town	2–2	Leytonstone
21	South Shields	2–2	Tow Law Town
22	Spennymoor United	1–0	Morecambe
23	Sutton United	2–2	Barnet
24	Tonbridge	5–1	Folkestone
25	Ware	0–2	Oxford City
26	Weymouth	1–1	Bath City
27	Wigan Athletic	1–1	Macclesfield Town
28	Wimbledon	3–0	Ashford Town (Kent)
29	Wycombe Wanderers	0–2	Dagenham
30	Yeovil Town	2–0	Welton Rovers

=== Replays ===
Tie	Home team	Score	Away team
2	Ryhope Colliery Welfare	4–1	Bishop Auckland
3	Bedford Town	2–3	Boston United
7	Cambridge City	0–1	Corby Town
13	Chichester City	0–3	Guildford City
16	Cambridge United	1–2	Lowestoft Town
19	Grantham	3–1	Retford Town
20	Leytonstone	2–1	Slough Town
21	Tow Law Town	1–0	South Shields
23	Barnet	3–1	Sutton United
26	Bath City	0–1	Weymouth
27	Macclesfield Town	3–0	Wigan Athletic

== 1967–68 FA Cup ==
See 1967-68 FA Cup for details of the rounds from the first round proper onwards.
