= 1964–65 FA Cup qualifying rounds =

Tournament details
- Country: England; Wales

The FA Cup 1964–65 is the 84th season of the world's oldest football knockout competition; The Football Association Challenge Cup, or FA Cup for short. The large number of clubs entering the tournament from lower down the English football league system meant that the competition started with a number of preliminary and qualifying rounds. The 30 victorious teams from the fourth round qualifying progressed to the first round proper.

== 1st qualifying round ==
=== Ties ===
Tie	Home team	Score	Away team
1	Andover	4–1	Alton Town
2	Annfield Plain	2–0	Durham City
3	Barking	1–2	Walthamstow Avenue
4	Barry Town	2–1	Stonehouse
5	Belper Town	2–2	Alfreton Town
6	Bishop Auckland	4–1	Shildon
7	Bognor Regis Town	1–3	Redhill
8	Boston United	0–14	Spalding United
9	Bury Town	2–1	Soham Town Rangers
10	Chatham Town	3–1	Bromley
11	Chatteris Town	1–2	Cambridge City
12	Chesham United	5–0	Aylesbury United
13	Clacton Town	9–1	Gorleston
14	Clitheroe	1–2	Morecambe
15	Consett	5–1	Boldon Colliery Welfare
16	Cowes	5–4	Chichester City
17	Dartford	5–0	Cray Wanderers
18	Desborough Town	2–1	Bourne Town
19	Dover	0–2	Canterbury City
20	Dulwich Hamlet	0–0	Wokingham Town
21	Eastbourne	4–0	Bexhill Town
22	Ellesmere Port Town	6–1	Rhyl
23	Ely City	5–1	Haverhill Rovers
24	Erith & Belvedere	0–4	Sutton United
25	Farsley Celtic	0–0	Scarborough
26	Ferryhill Athletic	5–0	Billingham Synthonia
27	Fleetwood	3–0	Milnthorpe Corinthians
28	Ford United	3–1	Clapton
29	Gainsborough Trinity	1–3	Goole Town
30	Gloucester City	3–1	Abergavenny Thursdays
31	Grays Athletic	0–2	Brentwood & Warley
32	Gresley Rovers	3–5	Atherstone Town
33	Halesowen Town	1–1	Bilston
34	Harlow Town	0–2	Barnet
35	Heanor Town	4–1	Buxton
36	Hertford Town	2–0	Harrow Town
37	Hillingdon Borough	1–2	Hayes
38	Hitchin Town	2–2	Biggleswade & District
39	Horsham	3–3	Haywards Heath
40	Horwich R M I	5–2	Accrington
41	Hounslow	1–4	Finchley
42	Huntley & Palmers	0–6	Hemel Hempstead
43	Hyde United	9–0	Bacup Borough
44	Ilford	3–4	Hornchurch
45	Kidderminster Harriers	1–0	Redditch
46	Kingstonian	2–0	Dorking
47	Lancaster City	1–1	Burscough
48	Leyton	2–3	Hendon
49	Leytonstone	7–1	Ruislip Manor
50	Littlehampton Town	1–3	Lewes
51	Lockheed Leamington	4–3	Hednesford Town
52	Long Eaton United	1–3	Ilkeston Town
53	Loughborough United	1–2	Nuneaton Borough
54	Louth United	2–5	Holbeach United
55	Lovells Athletic	1–1	Llanelli
56	Macclesfield	2–0	Oswestry Town
57	Maidstone United	1–3	Hastings United
58	March Town United	1–3	Wisbech Town
59	Marine	1–3	Altrincham
60	Marlow	1–7	Epsom & Ewell
61	Matlock Town	4–1	Creswell Colliery
62	Melksham Town	0–4	Cheltenham Town
63	Merthyr Tydfil	4–1	Cinderford Town
64	Minehead	2–1	Weston Super Mare
65	Murton Colliery Welfare	2–5	North Shields
66	Nelson	2–1	Lytham
67	New Brighton	8–3	Llandudno
68	Newbury Town	2–0	Abingdon Town
69	Newport I O W	1–5	Fareham Town
70	Newton Abbot Spurs	1–1	Falmouth Town
71	Northwich Victoria	5–2	Mossley
72	Ossett Albion	3–0	Harrogate Town
73	Oxford City	2–1	Banbury Spencer
74	Penrith	4–2	Willington
75	Petters Sports	0–5	Leatherhead
76	Poole Town	2–0	Bridport
77	Ramsgate Athletic	1–2	Folkestone
78	Retford Town	5–1	Norton Woodseats
79	Rossendale United	1–0	Great Harwood
80	Rugby Town	4–0	Moor Green
81	Runcorn	5–2	Holyhead Town
82	Rushden Town	2–3	Rothwell Town
83	Ryhope Colliery Welfare	3–2	Stanley United
84	Salisbury	3–3	Dorchester Town
85	Selby Town	1–5	Bridlington Trinity
86	Sheppey United	0–1	Ashford Town (Kent)
87	Sittingbourne	0–3	Bexley United
88	Skelmersdale United	0–0	Droylsden
89	Slough Town	4–1	Metropolitan Police
90	South Bank	1–4	Evenwood Town
91	South Liverpool	2–1	Ashton United
92	St Albans City	3–2	Letchworth Town
93	St Austell	3–5	Bideford
94	St Helens Town	4–1	Prescot Cables
95	Stafford Rangers	3–3	Sankey Of Wellington
96	Stalybridge Celtic	5–1	Chorley
97	Stamford	1–1	Skegness Town
98	Stevenage Town	5–0	Hatfield Town
99	Stocksbridge Works	1–4	Frickley Colliery
100	Stork	0–4	Borough United
101	Stourbridge	3–2	Brierley Hill Alliance
102	Sudbury Town	1–0	Great Yarmouth Town
103	Sutton Town	2–2	Arnold
104	Tamworth	2–0	Burton Albion
105	Taunton	0–1	Frome Town
106	Tilbury	1–1	Aveley
107	Tooting & Mitcham United	1–4	Carshalton Athletic
108	Trowbridge Town	3–1	Chippenham Town
109	Tunbridge Wells Rangers	1–3	Tonbridge
110	Uxbridge	0–3	Southall
111	Vauxhall Motors	0–2	Cheshunt
112	Wadebridge Town	2–6	St Blazey
113	Walton & Hersham	4–1	Chertsey Town
114	Ware	1–3	Bishop's Stortford
115	Wellingborough Town	0–2	St Neots Town
116	Wellington Town	1–3	Dudley Town
117	Wembley	2–2	Dagenham
118	Whitstable	2–7	Deal Town
119	Windsor & Eton	2–2	Corinthian Casuals
120	Winsford United	2–1	Congleton Town
121	Witton Albion	4–0	Lostock Gralam
122	Woking	1–3	Guildford City
123	Wolverton Town & B R	0–1	Bletchley Town
124	Worcester City	4–0	Bromsgrove Rovers
125	Worksop Town	2–1	Mexborough Town
126	Yorkshire Amateur	0–1	Bridlington Town

=== Replays ===
Tie	Home team	Score	Away team
5	Alfreton Town	0–3	Belper Town
20	Wokingham Town	2–0	Dulwich Hamlet
25	Scarborough	0–0	Farsley Celtic
33	Bilston	0–3	Halesowen Town
38	Biggleswade & District	2–4	Hitchin Town
39	Haywards Heath	1–2	Horsham
47	Burscough	1–2	Lancaster City
55	Llanelli	2–1	Lovells Athletic
70	Falmouth Town	3–2	Newton Abbot Spurs
84	Dorchester Town	1–3	Salisbury
88	Droylsden	1–2	Skelmersdale United
95	Sankey Of Wellington	3–0	Stafford Rangers
97	Skegness Town	4–0	Stamford
103	Arnold	2–0	Sutton Town
106	Aveley	2–0	Tilbury
117	Dagenham	3–0	Wembley
119	Corinthian Casuals	1–2	Windsor & Eton

=== 2nd replay ===
Tie	Home team	Score	Away team
25	Scarborough	5–0	Farsley Celtic

== 2nd qualifying round ==
=== Ties ===
Tie	Home team	Score	Away team
1	Altrincham	4–1	St Helens Town
2	Ashford Town (Kent)	2–2	Deal Town
3	Ashington	0–0	Tow Law Town
4	Atherstone Town	4–2	Ilkeston Town
5	Barnet	0–0	Hertford Town
6	Barnstaple Town	0–0	Bideford
7	Basingstoke Town	4–2	Cowes
8	Belper Town	2–1	Heanor Town
9	Bishop Auckland	2–3	North Shields
10	Bridlington Trinity	4–4	Bridlington Town
11	Bury Town	0–2	Cambridge City
12	Canterbury City	3–1	Folkestone
13	Chatham Town	2–4	Dartford
14	Chesham United	1–1	Hemel Hempstead
15	Cheshunt	1–1	Bletchley Town
16	Clacton Town	0–0	Sudbury Town
17	Crawley Town	5–0	Horsham
18	Dudley Town	0–3	Worcester City
19	Eastbourne United	1–7	Hastings United
20	Ellesmere Port Town	4–0	New Brighton
21	Ely City	0–2	Wisbech Town
22	Eynesbury Rovers	3–1	Rothwell Town
23	Fareham Town	2–1	Andover
24	Finchley	4–0	Southall
25	Ford United	2–5	Hendon
26	Frickley Colliery	2–0	Worksop Town
27	Frome Town	1–3	Minehead
28	Gloucester City	0–1	Llanelli
29	Goole Town	0–1	Retford Town
30	Grantham	1–1	Holbeach United
31	Halesowen Town	2–4	Lockheed Leamington
32	Harwich & Parkeston	2–3	Lowestoft Town
33	Hitchin Town	4–0	St Albans City
34	Horden Colliery Welfare	4–1	Ferryhill Athletic
35	Hornchurch	4–0	Aveley
36	Horwich R M I	1–1	Lancaster City
37	Hyde United	1–3	Nelson
38	Kidderminster Harriers	3–0	Sankey Of Wellington
39	Kingstonian	1–1	Leatherhead
40	Lewes	2–2	Redhill
41	Leytonstone	4–0	Dagenham
42	Macclesfield	4–1	Northwich Victoria
43	Matlock Town	1–3	Arnold
44	Merthyr Tydfil	4–0	Barry Town
45	Morecambe	6–1	Fleetwood
46	Newbury Town	0–2	Oxford City
47	Nuneaton Borough	2–1	Tamworth
48	Penrith	3–1	Evenwood Town
49	Rossendale United	0–3	Stalybridge Celtic
50	Rugby Town	5–0	Stourbridge
51	Runcorn	0–2	Borough United
52	Ryhope Colliery Welfare	1–1	Annfield Plain
53	Salisbury	1–1	Poole Town
54	Scarborough	2–1	Ossett Albion
55	Skegness Town	0–3	Spalding United
56	Skelmersdale United	2–2	South Liverpool
57	Slough Town	2–0	Carshalton Athletic
58	St Blazey	2–1	Falmouth Town
59	St Neots Town	3–0	Desborough Town
60	Stevenage Town	4–1	Bishop's Stortford
61	Stockton	2–3	Consett
62	Sutton United	1–1	Bexley United
63	Tonbridge	2–0	Eastbourne
64	Trowbridge Town	1–3	Cheltenham Town
65	Walthamstow Avenue	1–0	Brentwood & Warley
66	Walton & Hersham	1–5	Guildford City
67	Warminster Town	1–3	Portland United
68	Welton Rovers	4–0	Glastonbury
69	Westbury United	0–3	Devizes Town
70	Windsor & Eton	0–1	Hayes
71	Winsford United	1–1	Witton Albion
72	Wokingham Town	2–4	Epsom & Ewell

=== Replays ===
Tie	Home team	Score	Away team
2	Deal Town	4–2	Ashford Town (Kent)
3	Tow Law Town	0–0	Ashington
5	Hertford Town	0–2	Barnet
6	Bideford	3–0	Barnstaple Town
10	Bridlington Town	3–1	Bridlington Trinity
14	Hemel Hempstead	3–2	Chesham United
15	Bletchley Town	1–0	Cheshunt
16	Sudbury Town	4–2	Clacton Town
30	Holbeach United	0–1	Grantham
36	Lancaster City	2–1	Horwich R M I
39	Leatherhead	1–0	Kingstonian
40	Redhill	4–3	Lewes
52	Annfield Plain	2–0	Ryhope Colliery Welfare
53	Poole Town	0–1	Salisbury
56	South Liverpool	5–3	Skelmersdale United
62	Bexley United	3–1	Sutton United
71	Witton Albion	2–1	Winsford United

=== 2nd replay ===
Tie	Home team	Score	Away team
3	Ashington	1–2	Tow Law Town

== 3rd qualifying round ==
=== Ties ===
Tie	Home team	Score	Away team
1	Altrincham	0–3	South Liverpool
2	Annfield Plain	3–2	Tow Law Town
3	Atherstone Town	1–1	Nuneaton Borough
4	Barnet	2–0	Stevenage Town
5	Belper Town	3–3	Arnold
6	Cambridge City	1–2	Wisbech Town
7	Canterbury City	4–1	Deal Town
8	Cheltenham Town	6–1	Devizes Town
9	Dartford	3–1	Bexley United
10	Ellesmere Port Town	4–0	Borough United
11	Epsom & Ewell	0–1	Slough Town
12	Fareham Town	3–3	Basingstoke Town
13	Finchley	1–2	Hayes
14	Hemel Hempstead	1–1	Oxford City
15	Hendon	2–1	Leytonstone
16	Hitchin Town	0–4	Bletchley Town
17	Kidderminster Harriers	2–2	Worcester City
18	Leatherhead	1–2	Guildford City
19	Llanelli	2–7	Merthyr Tydfil
20	Lockheed Leamington	2–3	Rugby Town
21	Macclesfield	2–1	Witton Albion
22	Minehead	0–3	Welton Rovers
23	Morecambe	1–2	Lancaster City
24	Nelson	2–3	Stalybridge Celtic
25	North Shields	0–2	Horden Colliery Welfare
26	Penrith	3–3	Consett
27	Redhill	1–6	Crawley Town
28	Retford Town	3–0	Frickley Colliery
29	Salisbury	5–1	Portland United
30	Scarborough	3–1	Bridlington Town
31	Spalding United	4–0	Grantham
32	St Blazey	0–3	Bideford
33	St Neots Town	7–0	Eynesbury Rovers
34	Sudbury Town	0–5	Lowestoft Town
35	Tonbridge	3–0	Hastings United
36	Walthamstow Avenue	3–1	Hornchurch

=== Replays ===
Tie	Home team	Score	Away team
3	Nuneaton Borough	2–5	Atherstone Town
5	Arnold	1–0	Belper Town
12	Basingstoke Town	1–2	Fareham Town
14	Oxford City	4–2	Hemel Hempstead
17	Worcester City	1–2	Kidderminster Harriers
26	Consett	1–0	Penrith

== 4th qualifying round ==
The teams that given byes to this round are Wimbledon, Gateshead, Wycombe Wanderers, Yeovil Town, Hereford United, South Shields, King's Lynn, Chelmsford City, Blyth Spartans, Margate, Bath City, Kettering Town, Weymouth, Romford, Bedford Town, Cambridge United, Hinckley Athletic, Wigan Athletic, Gravesend & Northfleet, Bangor City, Netherfield, Maidenhead United, Bridgwater Town and Corby Town.

=== Ties ===
Tie	Home team	Score	Away team
1	Annfield Plain	3–2	Horden Colliery Welfare
2	Arnold	0–2	Corby Town
3	Atherstone Town	1–3	Hereford United
4	Barnet	3–3	Walthamstow Avenue
5	Bath City	4–1	Merthyr Tydfil
6	Bedford Town	1–4	Cambridge United
7	Bideford	1–0	Cheltenham Town
8	Canterbury City	3–0	Crawley Town
9	Chelmsford City	6–2	Oxford City
10	Consett	0–4	South Shields
11	Dartford	3–1	Tonbridge
12	Gateshead	1–4	Netherfield
13	Gravesend & Northfleet	1–0	Margate
14	Guildford City	9–0	Maidenhead United
15	Hayes	7–0	Wycombe Wanderers
16	Hendon	3–1	Slough Town
17	Kidderminster Harriers	5–1	Rugby Town
18	King's Lynn	6–0	St Neots Town
19	Lancaster City	2–3	Bangor City
20	Lowestoft Town	1–3	Kettering Town
21	Macclesfield	2–1	Ellesmere Port Town
22	Retford Town	2–3	South Liverpool
23	Salisbury	2–1	Yeovil Town
24	Scarborough	4–3	Blyth Spartans
25	Spalding United	3–1	Hinckley Athletic
26	Stalybridge Celtic	2–4	Wigan Athletic
27	Welton Rovers	1–0	Bridgwater Town
28	Weymouth	3–2	Fareham Town
29	Wimbledon	1–1	Romford
30	Wisbech Town	3–2	Bletchley Town

=== Replays ===
Tie	Home team	Score	Away team
4	Walthamstow Avenue	1–4	Barnet
29	Romford	2–1	Wimbledon

== 1964–65 FA Cup ==
See 1964-65 FA Cup for details of the rounds from the first round proper onwards.
