= Loughborough United F.C. =

English football club

Loughborough United
- Full name: Loughborough United Football Club
- Founded: 1960
- Dissolved: 1973
- Ground: Brown's Lane
Home colours

Loughborough United F.C. were an English football club based in Loughborough, Leicestershire, that played in the Midland League.

== History ==
The club was formed in 1960, the result of the club committee and supporters of semi-works side Brush Sports agreeing to set up a new club at the end of the 1959–60, to represent the town as a whole. At the start of February, the new club was christened Loughborough United, the new club to be run as a combined supporter/company club for the 1960–61 season, and afterwards as a "town" club.

United's first action was to decline to take up Brush's place in the Birmingham and District League and instead apply to join the Central Alliance. The club also recruited Trevor Lawless as player-manager and planned to run a fully professional side.

The club instantly made an impact by winning through the 1960–61 FA Cup qualifying rounds, but in the competition proper the club was unlucky to be drawn against another non-league side, King's Lynn, and lost 3–0 in a replay, with Bristol City awaiting the winner. The club did have the consolation of winning the Central Alliance Cup, and was runner-up in both the League's southern section (one point behind Skegness Town) and the Leicestershire Challenge Cup, losing 2–1 to Hinckley Athletic, both United goals coming from the penalty spot.

The club only lasted one season in the Central Alliance, being one of a number of clubs which withdrew to join a re-constituted Midland League from 1961–62. After a mid-table finish in its first season, spoilt by the sacking of Lawless after a suspension for using bad language, United won the title in 1962–63, not losing a match until March, but the success sowed the seeds of the club's demise - before the next season started, the club lost its three leading scorers (Richie Barker, Malcolm Stephens, and Barry Calladine) and never recovered.

It did reach the first round of the 1963–64 FA Cup, but was hammered 6–1 at Netherfield, four Netherfield goals coming in the first 12 minutes and all six by half-time. The club only ever won one more FA Cup qualifying round tie, and lost every FA Trophy fixture it played; in its 10 post-championship Midland League seasons, the club never finished higher than 15th (out of 22), finished bottom three times, and in the 1972–73 season had a goal difference of –144.

The club folded following that disastrous season, after the local council evicted the club, planning to build a leisure centre on its ground. The club's final match was a 2–2 draw at Retford Town on 28 April 1973, the club's only away point of the season.

The name was revived by a Sunday League side and on other occasions since.

== Colours ==
The club took on the Brush Sports colours of blue shirts and white shorts.

== Ground ==
The club also took on Brush Sports' ground at Browns Lane.
