= Ashfield United F.C. =

Ashfield United
- Full name: Ashfield United Football Club (incorporating Sutton Town Football Club)
- Founded: 1886
- Dissolved: 1997
- League: NCEFL Premier Division
- 1996–97: NCEFL Premier Division, 19th out of 20 (club dissolved)

Sutton Town F.C. was a football club based in Sutton-in-Ashfield, Nottinghamshire, England.

The club competed in the Central Alliance, Midland League, Northern Premier League and Northern Counties East League as Sutton Town before changing its name to Ashfield United in 1992. It disbanded in 1997.

== Former players ==
1. Players that have played/managed in the Football League or any foreign equivalent to this level (i.e. fully professional league).
2. Players with full international caps.
3. Players that hold a club record.
- Reginald Davies
- Bill Hand
- Trevor Lawless
- Paul Smalley

== Honours ==
Sutton Town's honours
Competition	Titles	Seasons
Nottinghamshire Senior Cup	17	1908–09, 1912–13, 1913–14, 1923–24, 1955–56, 1957–58, 1959–60, 1961–62, 1962–63, 1963–64, 1967–68, 1969–70, 1971–72, 1972–73, 1973–74, 1974–75, 1976–77
