= List of Ashford United F.C. seasons =

This is a list of seasons played by both the senior men's football club from Ashford, Kent (Ashford United, Ashford Railway Works and Ashford/Ashford Town) in English football since 1891 and for the Ashford/Ashford United Ladies team.

== Ashford United (1891–1906) ==
Ashford United were founded in 1891 – the union between South Eastern Rangers and Kentish Express FC. The team initially played at the Victoria Ground (behind the Victoria Hotel), then subsequently moved to Godinton Road, Ashford and finally to a site off Newtown Road. They were founder members of the original Kent League and additionally the team played in the East Kent League and the Thames & Medway Combination and Division 2 of the South Eastern League. The team folded owing to heavy debts during season 1906–07 and their league playing records for the season were expunged.

=== Ashford United (First Team) ===
Season	Lge	Pld	W	D	L	GF	GA	Pts	Pos	FA Cup	Other
1891–92										Q1	sf:KC
1892–93										Q2	w:KC
1893–94										Q1	
1894–95	Kent Lge Div 1	16	6	2	8	35	41	14	7/9	Q1(scratched)	
1895–96	Kent Lge Div 1	22	3	3	16	34	80	9	12/12	Q1	
1896–97	Kent Lge Div 1	16	5	5	6	33	34	15	5/9	P	
1896–97	East Kent Lge 1	8	2	1	5	15	23	5	4/5	P	
1897–98	Kent Lge Div 1	14	6	3	5	27	28	15	4/8	Q2	
1897–98	East Kent Lge 1	8	2	3	3	18	23	7	3/5	Q2	
1898–99	Kent League	24	9	6	9	54	56	24	8/13	Q1	
1898–99	East Kent Lge 1	6	2	2	2	15	13	6	2/4	Q1	
1899–1900	Kent League	19	6	2	11	23	51	14	9/11	Q1	
1899–1900	East Kent Lge 1	10	4	2	4	15	21	10	3/6	Q1	
1900–01	Kent League	16	8	3	5	35	21	19	4/9	Q1	
1900–01	East Kent Lge 1	6	3	0	3	5	7	6	3/ 4	Q1	
1901–02	Kent League	19	9	2	8	47	31	20	5/11	Q1	ru:KSC
1901–02	Thames Medway D1	11	3	2	6	19	30	8	?/7	Q1	ru:KSC
1902–03	Kent League	16	6	2	8	32	45	14	5/9	–	ru:KSC
1902–03	Thames Medway D1	12	5	0	7	19	29	10	5/7	–	ru:KSC
1903–04	Kent League	16	6	1	9	26	29	13	7/9	Q4	
1903–04	Thames Medway D1	10	0	2	8	5	37	2	6/6	Q4	
1904–05	Kent League	18	8	4	6	39	37	20	5/10	EP	
1904–05	Thames Medway D1	10	3	3	4	17	29	9	4/6	EP	
1905–06	Kent League	14	4	3	7	23	29	11	5/8	–	
1905–06	South Eastern Div 2	20	5	2	13	30	67	12	11/12	–	
1906–07	Kent League	withdrew during season								Q1	
1906–07	Thames Medway D1	withdrew during season								Q1	
Key: KSC=Kent Senior Cup; KC=Kent Cup

=== Ashford United 'A' Team ===
Season	Lge	Pld	W	D	L	GF	GA	Pts	Pos	Other
1896–97	East Kent Lge 2	8	4	1	3	18	12	9	3/5	

== Ashford Railway Works (1907–1928) ==
The Ashford Railway Works football club (the more commonly used name of the S.E and C.R. Ashford Works F.C.) was founded in 1907. They played their matches at the Railway Works Ground, off Newtown Road, Ashford. Many of its members were drawn from the ranks of skilled engineers from the Ashford railway works and led to the team acquiring the nickname the ‘Nuts and Bolts'. After the 1920s the team began to be known as simply Ashford. They played in the original East Kent League, Kent League (with significant success in Division 2 East) and also the Folkestone and District Senior League. The club discontinued in 1928.

=== Ashford Railway Works (First Team) ===
Season	Lge	Pld	W	D	L	GF	GA	Pts	Pos	FA Cup	Other
1907–08	East Kent League	18	11	1	6	49	26	23	3/10	P	
1907–08	Folkestone Snr Lge	22	11	3	8	49	46	25	6/12	P	
1908–09	East Kent League	10	7	1	2	34	6	15	1/6	Q1	
1908–09	Folkestone Snr Lge	18	11	3	4	43	19	35	?/10	Q1	
1909–10	Kent Div 2: East	20	14	1	5	75	38	29	2/11	Q1	
1909–10	Folkestone Snr Lge	20	13	6	1	56	16	32	1/11	Q1	
1910–11	Kent Div 2: East	16	10	0	6	37	16	20	3/9	P	
1910–11	Folkestone Snr Lge	18	7	2	9	52	37	16	3/10	P	
1911–12	Kent Div 2: East	14	10	1	3	45	19	21	1/8	Q1	
1911–12	Folkestone Snr Lge	20	14	4	2	63	26	30	3/11	Q1	
1912–13	Kent Div 2: East	12	7	3	2	26	13	17	1/7	P	
1912–13	Folkestone Snr Lge	21	12	1	8	55	38	25	4/12	P	
1913–14	Kent Div 2: East	18	13	3	2	48	17	29	1/10	Q1	
1913–14	Folkestone Snr Lge	15	8	5	2	31	28	18	4/9	Q1	
1919–20	Kent Div 2: East	14	10	2	2	60	20	22	1/8 ↑P	P	
1919–20	Folkestone Snr Lge	19	13	3	3	94	25	29	2/12	P	
1920–21	Kent Lge Div 1	31	13	6	12	50	42	32	10/17	Q1	
1921–22	Kent Lge Div 1	28	9	11	8	42	40	29	8/15	P	
1922–23	Kent Lge Div 1	32	13	8	11	63	50	34	6/17	P	sf:KSC
1923–24	Kent Lge Div 1	30	13	7	10	61	48	33	7/16	EP	ru:KLC
1924–25	Kent Lge Div 1	34	12	6	16	56	67	30	11/18	EP	
1925–26	Kent Lge Div 1	36	17	7	12	81	76	41	6/19	Q3	
1926–27	Kent Lge Div 1	26	8	3	15	36	58	19	12/14	Q1	
1927–28	Kent Div 2: East	4	2	1	1	9	9	5	1/3	P	
1927–28	Folkestone Snr Lge	24	13	2	9	66	60	28	7/15	P	
Key: KSC=Kent Senior Cup; KLC=Kent Cup

=== Ashford Railway Works Reserves ===
Season	Lge	Pld	W	D	L	GF	GA	Pts	Pos	Other
1908–09	Folkestone Jnr Lge	20	6	0	14	30	51	12	9/11	
1920–21	Kent Div 2: East	18	4	5	9	38	41	13	8/10	
1920–21	Folkestone Snr Lge	13	6	3	4	29	21	15	4/9	
1921–22	Kent Div 2: East	14	8	0	6	41	27	16	5/8	
1921–22	Folkestone Snr Lge	16	6	3	7	42	47	15	6/9	
1922–23	Kent Div 2: East	10	5	0	5	20	24	10	3/6	

== Ashford / Ashford Town (1930–2010) ==
Founded in 1930 Ashford F.C. were elected to the Kent League. They began playing at the Railway Works ground and then moved to the newly acquired Essella Park ground. On the sale of that facility in 1987 they ground-shared for two years at Cheriton Road, Folkestone before returning to Ashford and the new purpose-built Homelands stadium. From the 1950–1951 season the club began to style itself as Ashford Town Football Club rather than Ashford Football Club. The team were 1948–49 Kent League Champions and after that league disbanded in 1959 they joined the Southern League. As a result of the re-organisation of the structure of non-League football in 2004 the team was allocated to the Isthmian League. Owing to unpaid football debts the club was suspended by The Football Association from competition in 2010. As a result of a dispute between the club's Directors it went into financial administration and the club was wound up.

=== Ashford / Ashford Town (First Team) ===
Season	Lge	Pld	W	D	L	GF	GA	Pts	Pos	FA Cup	Other
1930–31	Kent Lge Div 1	36	16	10	10	93	70	42	6/19	Q2	sf:KSC
1931–32	Kent Lge Div 1	36	26	5	5	115	54	57	2/19	Q1	
1932–33	Kent Lge Div 1	34	16	1	17	79	76	33	8/18	Q2	
1933–34	Kent Lge Div 1	36	14	3	19	72	92	31	14/19	Q1	
1934–35	Kent Lge Div 1	36	16	9	11	72	51	41	5/19	R1	
1935–36	Kent Lge Div 1	36	12	6	18	84	97	30	12/19	P	
1936–37	Kent Lge Div 1	32	16	5	11	76	53	37	6/17	Q1	
1937–38	Kent Lge Div 1	32	11	6	15	61	75	28	11/17	Q2	
1938–39	Kent Lge Div 1	28	16	3	9	89	59	35	4/15	Q3	w:KLC
1939–40	Kent Regnl:East	19	4	4	11	44	59	12	10/11		
1946–47	Kent Lge Div 1	30	13	6	11	81	72	32	9/16	Q2	
1947–48	Kent Lge Div 1	34	12	5	17	59	68	29	12/18	Q1	
1948–49	Kent Lge Div 1	34	24	4	6	109	41	52	1/18	Q1	
1949–50	Kent Lge Div 1	32	15	8	9	83	62	38	7/17	EP	
1950–51	Kent Lge Div 1	32	18	7	7	87	53	43	4/17	Q1	
1951–52	Kent Lge Div 1	32	17	3	12	63	38	37	7/17	Q3	ru:KLC
1952–53	Kent Lge Div 1	32	13	9	10	65	48	35	7/17	Q1	
1953–54	Kent Lge Div 1	30	5	7	18	34	50	17	14/16	Q3	sf:KSS
1954–55	Kent Lge Div 1	32	11	7	14	49	52	29	12/17	Q1	
1955–56	Kent Lge Div 1	32	11	7	14	46	58	29	11/17	Q1	
1956–57	Kent Lge Div 1	32	13	3	16	59	59	29	10/17	Q1	
1957–58	Kent Lge Div 1	34	7	6	21	53	85	20	16/18	P	
1958–59	Kent Lge Div 1	34	16	4	14	75	53	36	9/18	R1	w:KSC
1959–60	Sthn Lge Div 1	42	14	12	16	61	70	40	14/22	R1	
1960–61	Sthn Lge Div 1	40	14	8	18	61	67	36	14/21	R1	
1961–62	Sthn Lge Div 1	38	14	11	13	66	70	39	11/20	R2	w:KFT; ru:KSC
1962–63	Sthn Lge Div 1	38	9	6	23	48	76	24	18/20	Q4	w:KSC
1963–64	Sthn Lge Div 1	42	19	9	14	73	57	46	7/22	Q4	
1964–65	Sthn Lge Div 1	42	11	8	23	60	98	30	17/22	Q2	
1965–66	Sthn Lge Div 1	46	9	10	27	44	92	28	23/24	Q1	
1966–67	Sthn Lge Div 1	46	18	8	20	74	68	44	11/24	R2	
1967–68	Sthn Lge Div 1	42	18	6	18	73	78	42	12/22	Q4	
1968–69	Sthn Lge Div 1	42	16	8	18	72	73	40	14/22	Q3	sf:SLC
1969–70	Sthn Lge Div 1	42	19	16	7	71	42	54	4/22 ↑P	Q4	
1970–71	Sthn Lge Prem	42	8	13	21	52	86	29	20/22 ↓R	Q1	sf:KSC
1971–72	Sthn Lge Div 1S	30	12	4	14	43	48	28	10/16	Q3	
1972–73	Sthn Lge Div 1S	42	24	7	11	90	40	55	3/22	Q4	sf:FAT
1973–74	Sthn Lge Div 1S	38	14	8	16	41	42	36	12/20	Q2	
1974–75	Sthn Lge Div 1S	38	16	12	10	64	55	44	7/20	R1	sf:KSC
1975–76	Sthn Lge Div 1S	38	14	8	16	67	73	36	10/20	Q2	
1976–77	Sthn Lge Div 1S	34	5	8	21	32	65	18	17/18	Q2	sf:KSC
1977–78	Sthn Lge Div 1S	38	9	13	16	39	60	31	15/20	Q1	
1978–79	Sthn Lge Div 1S	40	10	10	20	28	53	30	19/21	P	
1979–80	Sthn Lge S Div	46	12	14	20	54	71	38	19/24	Q2	
1980–81	Sthn Lge S Div	46	12	15	19	55	76	39	16/24	Q3	ru:KSC
1981–82	Sthn Lge S Div	46	16	14	16	52	56	46	14/24	Q3	ru:KSC
1982–83	Sthn Lge S Div	34	13	10	11	51	41	49	8/18	P	
1983–84	Sthn Lge S Div	38	19	5	14	65	47	62	8/20	Q4	sf:EFC
1984–85	Sthn Lge S Div	38	10	9	19	54	69	39	17/20	Q1	
1985–86	Sthn Lge S Div	40	10	12	18	45	65	42	18/21	Q1	
1986–87	Sthn Lge S Div	38	23	7	8	63	32	76	2/20 ↑P	Q2	sf:KSC
1987–88	Sthn Lge Prem	42	12	16	14	45	54	52	12/22	Q1	
1988–89	Sthn Lge Prem	42	13	13	16	59	76	52	18/22	Q3	
1989–90	Sthn Lge Prem	42	10	7	25	43	75	37	19/22 ↓R	Q2	
1990–91	Sthn Lge S Div	40	22	5	13	82	52	71	5/21	Q1	
1991–92	Sthn Lge S Div	42	17	12	13	66	57	63	7/22	P	sf:KSC
1992–93	Sthn Lge S Div	42	20	8	14	91	66	68	8/22	Q4	w:KSC
1993–94	Sthn Lge S Div	42	24	13	5	93	46	85	6/22	Q1	sf:EFC
1994–95	Sthn Lge S Div	42	21	12	9	106	72	75	5/22	R1	
1995–96	Sthn Lge S Div	42	25	9	8	75	44	84	2/22 ↑P	R1	w:KSC
1996–97	Sthn Lge Prem	42	9	18	15	53	79	45	19/22	R2	
1997–98	Sthn Lge Prem	42	8	5	29	34	85	29	21/22 ↓R	Q4	
1998–99	Sthn Lge S Div	42	17	12	13	59	54	63	7/22	Q2	
1999–2000	Sthn Lge E Div	42	21	9	12	70	49	72	6/22	Q1	
2000–01	Sthn Lge E Div	42	15	4	23	53	83	49	12/22	Q1	
2001–02	Sthn Lge E Div	42	14	6	22	58	78	48	14/22	P	sf:KSC
2002–03	Sthn Lge E Div	42	18	9	15	63	57	63	11/22	P	
2003–04	Sthn Lge E Div	42	15	9	18	51	53	54	12/22	Q1	
2004–05	Isth Lge Div 1	42	8	12	22	47	85	36	20/22	P	
2005–06	Isth Lge Div 1	44	8	11	25	41	81	35	21/23	Q1	
2006–07	Isth Lge Div 1S	42	10	14	18	52	65	44	18/22	Q1	sf:KSC
2007–08	Isth Lge Div 1S	42	19	10	13	64	51	67	8/22	P	
2008–09	Isth Lge Div 1S	42	16	15	11	68	54	63	7/22	Q1	
2009–10	Isth Lge Div 1S	42	9	11	22	49	90	38	20/22	Q1	
Key: KLC=Kent League Cup; KSC=Kent Senior Cup; KSS=Kent Senior Shield; KFT=Kent Floodlight Trophy; EFC=Eastern Floodlit Cup; SLC=Southern League Cup FAT=FA Trophy.

=== Ashford / Ashford Town Reserves ===
Season	Lge	Pld	W	D	L	GF	GA	Pts	Pos	Other
1931–32	Kent Amateur Lge:E	21	18	2	1	84	30	36	1/12	(−4;+2 pts)
1932–33	Folkestone Snr Lge	23	5	2	16	51	100	12	14/14	
1938–39	Kent Lge Div 2	24	9	5	10	72	74	23	9/13	
1946–47	Kent Cnty Am.Lge:E N	20	9	3	8	46	49	21	4/11	
1947–48	Kent Lge Div 2	26	12	3	11	62	60	27	7/14	
1948–49	Kent Lge Div 2	30	20	3	7	84	38	43	2/16	
1949–50	Kent Lge Div 2	31	18	4	9	92	49	40	?/17	w:KL2C
1950–51	Kent Lge Div 2	30	20	5	5	103	51	45	3/16	
1951–52	Kent Lge Div 2	28	13	6	9	79	64	32	7/15	
1952–53	Kent Lge Div 2	30	21	6	3	83	33	48	1/16	w:KL2C: ru:KIC
1953–54	Kent Lge Div 2	34	19	8	7	66	43	46	3/18	w:KIC
1954–55	Kent Lge Div 2	34	18	4	12	90	63	40	8/18	
1955–56	Kent Lge Div 2	32	22	7	3	111	34	51	1/17	ru:KIC
1956–57	Kent Lge Div 2	34	19	5	10	64	55	43	5/18	sf:KL2C
1956–57	Kent Cnty Am.Lge:E	26	9	5	12	50	60	23	8/14	Ashford 'A'
1957–58	Kent Lge Div 2	34	16	9	9	79	53	41	4/18	ru:KIC
1957–58	Kent Cnty Am.Lge:E	26	11	3	12	79	84	25	8/14	Ashford 'A'
1958–59	Kent Lge Div 2	34	23	3	8	84	44	49	4/18	
1958–59	Kent Cnty Am.Lge:E	30	15	5	10	111	68	35	7/16	Ashford 'A'
1959–60	Seanglian Lge	30	17	3	10	62	55	37	5/16	
1959–60	Kent Cnty Am.Lge:E S	25	12	2	11	51	40	26	7/14	Ashford 'A'
1960–61	Seanglian Lge	32	14	6	12	65	40	34	9/17	ru:SeLC
1961–62	Seanglian Lge	22	17	2	3	68	24	36	1/12	ru:SeLC; ru:KIC
1962–63	Seanglian Lge	23	8	7	8	30	36	23	7/13	
1963–64	Metropolitan & Dist.D2	28	5	6	17	31	68	16	13/15	
1966–67	Kent Prem Lge	26	7	3	16	42	64	17	11/14	
1967–68	Kent Prem Lge	34	7	6	21	44	90	20	15/18	
1970–71	Kent League	38	15	7	16	98	73	37	10/20	
1971–72	Kent League	37	13	11	13	67	77	37	11/20	ru:KLC
1972–73	Kent League	38	6	10	22	42	113	22	19/20	
1973–74	Kent League	36	10	11	15	64	80	31	15/19	
1974–75	Kent League	36	11	6	19	54	73	28	13/19	
1975–76	Kent League	36	8	5	23	57	117	21	16/19	
1979–80	Kent Lge Div 2	30	8	7	15	40	58	22	12/16	
1980–81	Kent Lge Div 2	36	13	5	18	50	76	31	13/19	
1981–82	Kent Lge Div 2	32	9	4	19	38	55	22	14/17	
1982–83	Kent Lge Div 2	34	10	12	12	56	57	32	12/18	
1983–84	Kent Lge Div 2	28	13	4	11	40	35	43	8/15	
1984–85	Kent Lge Div 2	32	19	6	7	61	37	63	2/17	
1985–86	Kent Lge Div 2	34	19	5	10	53	44	62	4/18	
1986–87	Kent Lge Div 2	34	18	7	9	64	43	61	4/18	ru:KLRC
1987–88	Kent Lge Div 2	34	23	5	6	77	25	74	2/18	
1988–89	Kent Lge Div 2	36	24	4	8	67	32	76	2/19	
1989–90	Kent Lge Div 2	32	13	7	12	40	43	46	8/17	
1990–91	Kent Lge Div 2	30	17	7	6	65	29	58	2/16	
1999–2000	Kent Lge Div 1N	20	10	4	6	36	23	34	3/11	
2000–01	Kent Lge Div 1	38	16	11	11	67	67	59	9/20	
2001–02	Kent Lge Div 1S	20	8	6	6	43	29	30	5/11	
2002–03	Kent Lge Div 1S	22	12	3	7	43	26	29	4/12	
2003–04	Kent Lge Div 1	22	8	3	11	29	37	27	7/12	
2004–05	Kent Lge Div 1	22	9	2	11	40	45	29	6/12	
2005–06	Kent Lge Div 1	22	8	4	10	38	47	28	8/12	
2006–07	Kent Lge Div 1	22	1	3	18	14	78	6	12/12 ↓R	
2007–08	Kent Lge Div 2	24	14	5	5	68	36	47	2/13 ↑P	w:KLRC
2008–09	Kent Lge Div 1	22	11	3	8	36	27	36	5/12	
2009–10	Kent Lge Div 1	20	6	6	8	27	30	24	7/11	
Key: KLC=Kent League Cup; KLRC=Kent League Reserves Cup; KIC=Kent Intermediate Cup; SeLC=Seanglian League Cup

== Ashford United (2011–present) ==
=== Ashford United (First Team) ===
Formed by one of the Directors of the former Ashford Town club, Ashford United was formed in 2011 and resurrected the name of the team from 1891 to 1907. The club began playing in the Kent Invicta League and after two seasons advanced to the Kent League which renamed itself as the Southern Counties East Football League. The team were promoted as SCEFL Champions to the Isthmian League in 2017.

Season	Lge	Pld	W	D	L	GF	GA	Pts	Pos	FA Cup	Other
2011–12	Kent Invicta Lge	30	15	7	8	65	44	52	5/16	–	
2012–13	Kent Invicta Lge	30	20	6	4	79	32	66	3/16 ↑P	P	
2013–14	Sth Cnties East FL	32	22	3	7	72	37	69	2/17	P	ru:KST
2014–15	Sth Cnties East FL	38	25	10	3	96	39	85	2/20	P	
2015–16	Sth Cnties East FL	36	23	7	6	95	46	66*	3/19	EP	ru:KST qf:FAV
2016–17	Sth Cnties East FL: Prem.	38	30	2	6	119	39	92	1/20 ↑P	Q1	w:KST
2017–18	Isth Lge Div 1S	46	10	8	28	60	111	38	21/24	Q1	
2018–19	Isth Lge Div 1SE	36	21	5	10	74	36	68	4/19	P	
2019–20	Isth Lge Div 1SE	30	19	2	9	75	41	59	2/20	Q1	COVID curtailed
2020–21	Isth Lge Div 1SE	6	2	1	3	9	11	7	n/a	Q1	Covid curtailed
2021–22	Isth Lge Div 1SE	38	22	6	10	79	48	72	2/19	P	
2022–23	Isth Lge Div 1SE	38	16	9	13	57	47	57	9/19	Q2	
2023–24	Isth Lge Div 1SE	38	14	3	21	57	82	45	11/20	P	sf:ILC
2024–25	Isth Lge Div 1SE	42	16	8	18	75	78	56	11/22	Q3	
2025–26	Isth Lge Div 1SE	42	20	7	15	92	67	67	9/22	Q2	
Key: KST=Kent Senior Trophy; FAV= FA Vase; ILC=Isthmian League Cup; *= 10 pts deduction.

=== Ashford United Reserves ===
Season	Lge	Pld	W	D	L	GF	GA	Pts	Pos	Other
2015–16	Kent Cnty Lge 2E	20	6	0	14	41	59	18	8/11	

=== Ashford United Thirds ===
Season	Lge	Pld	W	D	L	GF	GA	Pts	Pos	Other
2015–16	Ashford Dist Sunday Lge D3	18	9	1	8	50	53	28	6/11	
2016–17	Ashford Dist Sunday Lge D3	18	6	2	10	45	53	20	6/10	
2017–18	Ashford Dist Sunday Lge D3	16	6	1	9	57	60	19	6/9	
2018–19	Ashford Dist Sunday Lge D3	20	12	2	6	80	41	38	5/11	
2019–20	Ashford Dist Sunday Lge D3	14	10	1	3	62	17	31	1/10 ↑P	Covid curtailed
2020–21	Ashford Dist Sunday Lge D2	4	3	0	1	17	9	9	n/a	Covid curtailed
2021–22	Ashford Dist Sunday Lge D2	18	10	1	7	63	49	31	3/10 ↑P	
2022–23	Ashford Dist Sunday Lge D1	18	7	4	7	54	46	25	5/10	
2023–24	Ashford Dist Sunday Lge D1	14	1	1	12	9	76	3	8/8	

== Ashford / Ashford United Ladies ==
Ashford Ladies team first entered league competition in the 1971 Kent Women's League Division 1 West. The team was affiliated within the Ashford United organisation in 2022.

Season	Lge	Pld	W	D	L	GF	GA	Pts	Pos	Other
2005–06	SE Counties: Kent Div	14	10	2	2	96	18	32	1/8 ↑P	
2006–07	SE Counties: D1 East	16	4	4	8	36	55	16	7/9	
2007–08	SE Counties: D1 East	14	7	0	7	49	36	21	4/8	
2008–09	SE Counties: D1 East	20	11	3	6	55	50	36	5/11	
2009–10	SE Counties: D1 East	18	14	2	2	56	17	44	2/11 ↑P	
2010–11	SE Counties: Premier	16	0	0	16	16	88	0	9/9 ↓R	
2011–12	SE Counties: D1 East	20	8	2	10	30	54	26	8/11	
2012–13	SE Counties: D1 East	16	9	2	5	37	24	29	3/9	
2013–14	SE Counties: D1 East	16	5	4	7	30	30	19	6/9	
2014–15	SE Counties: D1 East	14	10	2	2	45	15	32	1/18 ↑P	
2015–16	SE Counties: Premier	14	4	4	6	23	34	16	5/8	
2016–17	SE Counties: Premier	18	8	3	7	45	36	27	5/10	
2017–18	SE Counties: Premier	18	5	3	10	29	46	18	8/10	
2018–19	SE Counties: Premier	18	12	2	4	59	33	38	3/10	
2019–20	SE Counties: Premier	10	4	1	5	22	24	13	6/10	Covid curtailed
2020–21	Ldn&SE Rgn D1 East	2	2	0	0	11	0	6	5/8	Covid curtailed
2021–22	Ldn&SE Rgn D1 East	18	13	2	3	60	27	41	3/10	
2022–23	Ldn&SE Rgn D1 East	22	19	0	3	113	23	57	1/12 ↑P	w:LSESh
2023–24	Ldn&SE Rgn Premier	22	4	5	13	32	53	17	10/12	
2024–25	Ldn&SE Rgn Premier	22	3	3	16	22	82	12	11/12↓R	
2025–26	Ldn&SE Rgn D1 North	20	4	1	15	20	62	13	10/11	
Key: LSESh=London & South East Regional League Trophy

League Record

- Pld = Played
- W = Games won
- D = Games drawn
- L = Games lost
- GF = Goals for
- GA = Goals against
- Pts = Points
- Pos = Final position/rank

FA Cup

- EP = Extra preliminary round
- P = Preliminary round
- Q1 = First qualifying round
- Q2 = Second qualifying round
- Q3 = Third qualifying round
- Q4 = Fourth qualifying round
- R1 = First round proper
- R2 = Second round proper

Other

- ↑P = promoted
- ↓R = relegated
- w = winner
- ru = runner-up
- sf = semi-finalist

See also each section for key to 'other'
