= Alan Morton (footballer, born 1950) =

English footballer

Personal information
- Date of birth: 13 April 1950 (age 76)
- Place of birth: Erith, England
- Position: Forward

Senior career*
| Years | Team | Apps | (Gls) |
| 1967–1968 | Woking | 2 | (2) |
| 1968–1969 | Crystal Palace | 0 | (0) |
| 1969–1970 | Stockport County | 14 | (2) |
| 1970 | Nuneaton Borough | ? | (?) |
| 1970–1971 | Fulham | 1 | (1) |
| 1971–1972 | Wimbledon | 29 | (13) |
| 1972–1973 | Ashford Town (Kent) | | |
| 1973–1975 | Maidstone United | ? | (?) |
| 1975–1981 | Woking | 219 | (108) |
| | Kingstonian | ? | (?) |
| | Wokingham Town | ? | (?) |
| | Walton & Hersham | ? | (?) |
| | Farnborough Town | ? | (?) |
| 1984 | Epsom & Ewell | 17 | (8) |
| 1984–1985 | Woking | 35 | (14) |
| | Westfield | ? | (?) |
| 1989 | Woking | 2 | (0) |
- * Club domestic league appearances and goals

Alan Morton (born 13 April 1950) is an English former professional footballer who played in the Football League as a forward.

Morton holds the modern record for a single season goalscoring for Ashford Town (Kent), scoring 46 goals in 59 games in all competitions in 1972/73.

Morton played a total of 361 games for Woking in all competitions, scoring 178 goals.
