= Jim French (footballer, born 1907) =

Scottish footballer

Personal information
- Full name: James John Buchanan French
- Date of birth: 31 December 1907
- Place of birth: Tannochside, Scotland
- Position: Inside forward

Youth career
- Glenboig Cameronians

Senior career*
Years	Team	Apps	(Gls)
1929–1930	Airdrieonians	0	(0)
1930–1931	Gillingham	18	(1)
1931	Montrose	1	(0)
1932–1933	Tunbridge Wells Rangers		
1933–1934	Clapton Orient	4	(1)
1934–1937	Ashford		
1937–1939	Folkestone		
- * Club domestic league appearances and goals

James John Buchanan French (born 31 December 1907) was a Scottish footballer who made 22 appearances in the Football League playing as an inside forward for Gillingham and Clapton Orient in the 1930s.

In 1932 he played non-league football with Tunbridge Wells Rangers: playing in a Southern League match in September 1932 he scored seven goals (in a 17-1 win) over Peterborough & Fletton United He returned to a League club with Clapton Orient for the 1933–1934 season and then played for three and a half seasons with Kent League Ashford before moving on to Folkestone in December 1937.
