= Ashford United F.C. =

Association football club in England

Ashford United FC
- Full name: Ashford United Football Club
- Nicknames: The Nuts & Bolts
- Founded: 1891
- Ground: The Homelands, Kingsnorth
- Capacity: 3,200 (500 seated)
- Owner: Ashford United Football Club Ltd (07110886)
- Chairman: Joint: Lloyd Hume & Dave Warr
- Manager: Craig Stone
- League: Isthmian League South East Division
- 2025–26: Isthmian League South East Division, 9th of 22
Home colours	Away colours

Ashford United F.C. are an English football club based in Ashford, Kent. The 'new' United was formed in 2011, resurrecting the name used by the town's football club between 1891 and 1907. Following the demise of the original Ashford United club in 1907 and through to 1928 Ashford was represented by Ashford Railway Works FC and after that between 1930 and 2010 by Ashford Town F.C. The current club is effectively a 'phoenix club' having risen from the ashes of the financial ruin of its predecessor. Although not a supporter owned club, like most non-league clubs, it relies on contributions of volunteers and supporters.

Ashford United are currently members of the Isthmian League South East Division following their record-breaking promotion from the Southern Counties East Football League in the 2016–17 season. They are one of very few semi-professional teams in England to have a synthetic 3G pitch, which is located at their home stadium 'The Green Box Stadium' formerly known as Homelands.

== History ==
For each season's League and Cup records of the Ashford clubs see: List of Ashford United F.C. seasons.

=== South Eastern Rangers (1881–1891) ===
The roots of senior football in Ashford originate in 1881 with the South Eastern Rangers who played at Newtown Green (with dressing rooms in the adjacent Alfred Arms). Over a six-year period between 1886 and 1891 the club on four occasions reached the final of the Kent county knock-out competition (the fore-runner of the Kent Senior Cup): in 1886 and 1888 playing for the Kent Badge they lost on both occasions to Chatham, (the second loss being a 6–1 defeat in a replay at the Victoria Ground in Ashford following a goalless first match); and in 1889 and 1891 lost in the final of the Kent Cup to Chatham and the Lincoln Regiment respectively (in the intervening season of 1890 the Rangers were Kent Cup semi-finalists).

In May 1889 to commemorate the club being runners-up in three Kent Badge/Cup finals in four seasons the Kent FA presented the club with a small shield. However the loss in the 1891 Kent Cup final sparked bad feeling between the club and the Kent FA – the club felt insulted by the ‘quality and character’ of the losers medals and returned them and subsequently resigned from the Kent FA. Against this backdrop was news of formation of a new club.

=== Ashford United (1891–1907) ===
In July 1891 the first Ashford United F.C. was formed by the amalgamation of the South Eastern Rangers and Kentish Express FC – albeit a hold-out faction of the former club continued to exist. The new club's home ground was behind the Victoria Hotel and the team played in a white shirt (with blue Maltese Cross) and blue shorts. About 700 people yielding gate receipts of £5 were present for 'United's' first match at the Victoria Ground on 19 September 1891, a defeat by the Highland Light Infantry 1–5. Two weeks later the club played their first FA Cup match, an away first round qualifying tie in which they were defeated 6–2 at Crouch End. Later, on 24 October 1891 Ashford played host to a touring Canadian team; the result was a 1–3 loss (Ashford's scorer J Hamblin) in a match notable for the sending-off (for verbally abusing the referee) of one of the Dominion's players. In their first tilt at the Kent Cup ‘United’ reached the semi-final in February 1892 before losing out to Gravesend.

In April 1893 the team exceeded the exploits of their forerunners and defeated Chatham 2–0 to win the Kent Cup (United scorers: Archie Munro and Frank Young). Despite Ashford's protestations that the match should have been played at a neutral venue, it was played at Chatham. Ashford had been the beneficiaries of a bye prior to the final – in the semi-final they were due to meet the West Kent Regiment but they were posted to Ireland before the match took place.

The following season, in October 1893, in an 1893–94 FA Cup first round qualifying match Ashford United suffered their – and for every Ashford club thereafter – worst defeat: a 12–0 loss to Woolwich Arsenal (for whom it was an all-time biggest goal difference equalling win). The tie was not without controversy as before the match it was reported in the Kentish Independent Newspaper that Arsenal, a team playing at a higher level (they had that season joined the Football League Second Division), expected a one-sided victory and had openly offered Ashford £20 and the promise of a friendly match against their second team in Ashford if they would scratch from the tie: the offer was not accepted.

The club were founder members of the Kent League in 1894–95 finishing seventh of nine teams. For the following season an externally financed 200 seat stand was constructed at the Victoria Ground. With many competing teams now turning to professionalism the amateur 'United' team finished in twelfth and bottom place in the 1895–96 Kent League. Consequently, to preserve its division one status, the team faced a 'test' match against second division Faversham: the result was a 5–0 victory for 'United'. As it transpired it was irrelevant as the larger North Kent clubs departed the Kent League to join the higher ranked Southern League and Ashford and Faversham were both included in the revised 1896–97 Kent League Division 1. Additionally Ashford joined the top division of the newly instituted East Kent League with a reserve team in the second division for one season. 'United' joined the ranks of professional clubs in the 1897–98 season and began engaging paid players.

In 1898 the club moved to a new home stadium at Godinton Road and the stand from the Victoria ground was relocated. The new ground was beyond the Godinton Road railway bridge and thus a fair distance from the clubs core area of support. The 1899 Kent Senior Cup Final (in which Maidstone beat Folkestone) was staged at the new stadium. 'United' were essentially a mid-table team during their seasons in the Kent League. A notable result was a 0–10 defeat at Sittingbourne in a Kent League match in January 1899.

In early 1900 two Ashford players, Gilbert Godsmark and George Foley were transferred to Second Division club Newton Heath. The former of these players is notable as the first signed for a transfer fee by the club that was shortly to become Manchester United. The fee of £40 was payable in two instalments with half paid immediately and the remainder after satisfactory completion of a trial period. After scoring four goals in nine matches, early the following year, Godsmark died of disease on army service at the Second Boer War – with Ashford reportedly serving a writ for the remaining £20.

The team, now in a blue and white striped kit, played in two successive Kent Senior Cup Finals, but were unsuccessful on both occasions. Season 1901–02 saw them lose a replay 1–4 to Sittingbourne (played at Ramsgate), following a 2–2 draw (played at Faversham) in which Sittingbourne had scored a penalty two minutes from time to force the replay. Then during the following 1902–03 season they lost 1–2 to Maidstone with the tie played again at Faversham. During the early 1900s in addition to playing in The Kent League the club competed in the Thames & Medway Combination – they finished each season at near or at the bottom of this league.

In the summer of 1903 the club left the Godinton Road ground and returned to their spiritual home of Newtown to a railway owned site off Newtown Road (under the railway arches on the Willesborough side of the river). During the 1903–04 season the team achieved a then club best in reaching the FA Cup 4th qualifying round, where they were defeated at home 0–2 by old rivals Chatham. For the 1905–06 season, whilst continuing to play in the Kent League, the club decided to join the newly formed Division 2 of the South Eastern League in preference to the Thames & Medway Combination – this increased the number of matches and travelling costs but the committee were hopeful that as it would bring fresh teams to the town it would prove financially beneficial. The team finished eleventh of the twelve teams in the new league with home and away fixtures with West Hampstead unplayed: the decision was reversed for the following season.

The club began the 1907–08 campaign with financial matters precipitating a cut in expenditure, however the money problems could not be overcome. In November 1906 the team was struggling on the pitch: fielding weakened teams led to several heavy defeats (two Thames and Medway defeats 1–11 and (a record equalling worst) 0–12 both to Sittingbourne and 0–8 in the Kent League to Dover). Into January 1907 the club were failing to fulfil some fixtures: their final match on 26 January 1907 was a 3–0 Kent League home defeat by Cray Wanderers. Early the next month the club collapsed with debts of £80. At the time of their demise Ashford United were bottom of both the Kent League (having won two of ten matches in which they had conceded 35 goals) and the Thames & Medway Combination (28 goals conceded from five matches with a single win): their records were expunged from the league tables.

=== Ashford Railway Works: (1907–1928) ===
Shortly after the demise of Ashford United "through the instrumentality of Mr Walter Hole and others" at a meeting at the Victoria Hotel it was decided to form a new club connected with the South Eastern and Chatham Railway (who had a large works in Ashford). Initially the club took the name of its forerunner but promptly changed this to S.E and C.R. Ashford Works F.C. – becoming more commonly known as Ashford Railway Works. The club's home ground was the same as its predecessor, off Newtown Road, and is believed to have been provided rent-free by the South Eastern & Chatham Railway.

Playing in red and green quartered colours the Ashford Railway Works club joined the East Kent League and the Folkestone and District Senior League. In 1908–09 they were East Kent League champions; the following season, 1909–10, they won the Folkestone and District Senior League and were also runners-up in Kent League Division 2 Eastern section (formerly known as the East Kent League). The railwaymen went on to win the latter league in four successive seasons: 1911–12, 1912–13, 1913–14 and 1919–20 (the latter after the break caused by the Great War). The Railway Works team had finished tied on points in both the 1912–13 and 1913–14 seasons with Folkestone Gas and Folkestone respectively but took the Championship by winning a deciding play-off match on each occasion.

The club became known simply as 'Ashford' upon the post-war resumption of the Kent League competition. Around this time the club acquired its nickname of the 'Nuts and Bolts' as many of the members were drawn from the ranks of skilled engineers from the railway. Having won Division 2 Eastern the previous season the club were promoted to Division One of the Kent League for the 1920–21 season where they finished tenth from seventeen teams: the team maintained mid table finishes in this league until their final Division One season of 1926–1927. The team reached the semi-finals of the Kent Senior Cup in 1922–1923 but were beaten in a replay to the eventual trophy winners Maidstone (the 'Nuts and Bolts' equalised through a penalty in the last minute of the original tie). The following season the team reached the final of the inaugural Kent League Cup in May 1924, losing out 2–0 to Northfleet United.

As a consequence of the 1923 merger of railway companies which formed the Southern Railway by 1927 the club no longer came under the wing of the South Eastern and Chatham Railway but came under the auspices of the Southern Railway Mechanics Institute. They were opposed to any section running into debt and expected them to be self-supporting. The team had unacceptably lost several hundred pounds in finishing twelfth of fourteen teams in their 1926–1927 Kent League Division 1 campaign so it was decided to return the club to amateur status and to playing in the Kent League Division 2 East and the Folkestone and District Senior League. This situation lasted only one season after which the club quit the leagues leaving Ashford with no senior club. The Ashford Railway Works club did though go out on a high as champions of the three team 1927–1928 Kent League Division 2 East.

=== Ashford / Ashford Town (1930–2010) ===
==== Kent League: Pre-War (1930–1940) ====
The decision to found Ashford Football Club was taken at a meeting held at the County Theatre on 28 April 1930 chaired by the editor of the Kentish Express Sir Charles Igglesden. The new club was elected to the Kent League and won their first match on 30 August of the same year at the Railway Works ground with visitors Canterbury Waverley beaten 4–2. In this first season the new club finished sixth in the 19 team league and were losing semi-finalists in the Kent Senior Cup to eventual winners Dartford who were themselves Southern League Championship winners that season.

In October 1931 the club moved to a new ground at Essella Road in Ashford. A company was formed to purchase the land for £550 and with improvements to the pitch and facilities for a ground with a 4,000 spectator capacity the total cost was £1,500 – with annual rental to the football club to be £60. The new Essella Park pitch featured a notable slope with the Willesborough end higher than the Ashford end. The first match at the ground on 31 October 1931, with Ashford playing in claret and blue, was a 4–1 win over Sittingbourne in front of over 2,000 spectators.

Ashford were mostly a mid-table ranked team in the seasons to 1939, however in their first campaign of 1931–32 they were distant runners-up in the Kent League to Northfleet United (who at the time were a nursery team for Football League Division 2 team Tottenham Hotspur). The team scored an all-time club record 115 goals over the 36 match season and concluded the season with a sequence of only one loss (to champions Northfleet United) in their last 14 league matches (W12; D1; L1). This included consecutive league wins in the final six matches of the season which together with three straight league wins at the start of the next season created an Ashford FC club record of nine consecutive league wins. The 'Nuts and Bolts' Reserve side tasted success in the 1931–32 season by winning the Kent Amateur League Eastern section with an equally impressive goalscoring record of 84 goals over 21 matches played. The former Crystal Palace and Sheffield United forward Bert Menlove joined the club as a player in 1931 (scoring 25 goals in the 1931–32 season) and became player-manager between 1932 and 1934.

The next season, 1932–33, was literally a season of two halves: for the first 17 league games the team won 12 matches with 1 drawn and 4 lost; the second 17 matches was a complete reversal with only 4 won and 13 lost which included a club record 7 successive league defeats (part of an 8-game run of losses). There was little significant improvement in the subsequent 1933–34 campaign: at mid-season the continued existence of the club was under threat owing to lack of support and associated financial difficulties. In March 1934 then record Tottenham Hotspur goal-scorer, and scorer of the only goal in the 1921 FA Cup Final, Jimmy Dimmock made his debut for the 'Nuts and Bolts', he scored twice and provided an assist in a 3–1 Kent League victory over Aylesford Paper Mills. Two weeks later he played in the Kent League match in which Ashford suffered their record largest league defeat (and all-match goals conceded record) with a 3–14 drubbing at Folkestone Reserves. The financial crisis was averted by a nursery club tie-up with Football League Third Division South Clapton (now Leyton) Orient who then proposed (unsuccessfully) that Ashford would enter the Eastern Section of the 1934–35 Southern League in place of their reserve side.

This association with 'Orient' created the most high-profile game played in the early years at Essella Park: in the 1934–35 FA Cup First Round Proper Ashford, who had won away at Kent League powerhouse team Northfleet United in the final qualifying round, were drawn against Clapton Orient. The tie had extra spice: Ashford were 'Orient's' nursery team and they had loaned a couple of young players and transferred several players to the 'Nuts and Bolts'. The most notable was former Liverpool and England full back Tommy Lucas whom Orient had appointed as Ashford's manager. In a match that "lacked nothing in vigour and spirit" in front of nearly 4,000 spectators Ashford scored first through Jim French but fell 4–1 to their visitors. In the spring of 1935 Ashford were reporting that 'Orient' were failing to fulfil the agreed terms of the nursery arrangement and were therefore experiencing a financial shortfall and having to cut expenses. Ashford had started their 1934–35 Kent League campaign with seven wins from eight matches (W7; L1) but during April 1935 they recorded a nine match win-less run (D4; L5).

The arrangement with Orient was downgraded to a 'working arrangement' for the 1935–1936 season. In The spring of 1936 the club once more encountered financial problems and was the subject of a Commission set-up by the Kent County FA to reach agreement between a newly set-up Emergency Club Committee and players over unpaid wages. The club weathered the storm and by the end of the 1939 season the Annual Meeting reported that the club was in a financially sound position with a credit balance at the bank and all debts paid save for an old bank debt which was being paid-down by the Supporters Association (whose contributions to the club were covering of the order of 25% of the annual costs).

In a midweek home game in April 1937, towards the end of their 1936–1937 Kent League fixtures, the team recorded their largest (and for any Ashford team) victory with a 15–0 rout of Erith & Belvedere with Joe West scoring seven of the goals. For the 1937–1938 season the club entered into a single season working (but not nursery) arrangement with Football League Division 2 club West Ham who provided access to their amateur and fringe players. The season ended with a new record of ten straight Kent League matches without a win (D3; L7) culminating in a 1–8 defeat at Aylesford Paper Mills.

The final home game played by the club before the wartime suspension of Kent League matches was the 1938–39 Kent League Cup final replay victory for the 'Nuts and Bolts', beating Bexleyheath and Welling 1–0 (scorer: Tricker) after a 1–1 draw in the original tie. In the final league match four days prior to the final there was a heavy 1–11 league match defeat at Erith & Belvedere, the club Ashford had routed 2 years previously. During the campaign the team had created an Ashford FC club record of 8 consecutive league wins within a single season, scoring 36 goals whilst conceding 6. Tricker was club top-scorer over all matches with 42 out of the 105 goals scored. Harry Todd formerly of Margate (via their nursery deal with Arsenal) and former Tunbridge Wells Rangers captain joined the club for the 1938–1939 season as player-coach of the team and continued post-war.

For the 1939–40 season before the full wartime suspension of league football for the club, they played in the Eastern Group of the Kent Regional League finishing tenth of eleven teams.

==== Kent League: Post-War (1946–1959) ====
After the war, at a meeting in February 1946 it was decided to revive the club. The company which in 1931 had been set-up to own the ground had been struck-off in 1940 and the club were fearful the then owners would use the land for development – the scenario was averted when club president and co-founder/owner of Norman Cycles Fred Norman purchased the ground for a reported £1,900 and agreed to waive the first years rent.

The team rejoined the Kent League competition. In their first season back, 1946–47, the club scored a post-war record single match goal tally (and post-war then record nine goal winning margin) in a Christmas Day 11–2 demolition of Folkestone at Essella Park. The next day saw a 5–5 draw in the return match at Folkestone.

For the 1948–49 campaign Joe Fagg was appointed club manager: he had been associated with the club for many years including as an effective treasurer during the financially difficult pre-war period. Former West Ham United defender Charlie Walker joined as player-coach from Margate (where he had been the Kent League league winning coach for the previous two seasons – with a League, League Cup and Senior Cup treble in the latter). Under their leadership Ashford won the 1948–49 Kent League Championship; this top spot was decided by 'goal average' as there was a three-way tie at the top of the table with two other clubs (Dover and Ramsgate) finishing on an identical 52 points. In recognition of the achievement the club presented an engraved fountain pen to each player. The team scored 109 goals in their league campaign (second highest ever to the 115 scored in the 1931–32 season): Ted Wells was top-scorer with 27 goals from 25 league games (he repeated the feat of a 20-goal haul for the following season too) and Fred James next best with 23 from 31. Wells created a record of scoring in nine consecutive games – eight of which were league games. In their run to the championship the team established a record of 20 consecutive unbeaten league matches (W16; D4). It was almost a double celebration: the Ashford Reserves team were pipped to top spot in Kent League Division 2 by Folkestone.

The 'Nuts and Bolts' second string were eventually successful and took the Kent League Division 2 title in both the 1952–53 and 1955–56 campaigns. During the latter campaign they achieved a 21 league game unbeaten run (W16; D5). It was a particularly successful period for the reserve side who won the Kent League 2 Cup in both 1949–50 by defeating Ramsgate Reserves 4–1 and in 1952–53 (for the League and Cup double) beating Sittingbourne Reserves 2–1. The Reserves also appeared in four Kent Intermediate Cup finals: 1952–53 losing 3–1 to Dover Reserves; and facing Folkestone Reserves three times 1953–54 (won 2–0), 1955–56 (lost 2–1) and 1958–56 (lost 2–0). The Reserves rounded off the decade in the 1958–59 campaign with a 15 league game unbeaten run (W14; D1) – the 14 wins being consecutive.

From the 1950–1951 season the club began to style itself as Ashford Town Football Club rather than Ashford Football Club. The 'Town' started the season in style with a 9–3 home victory over Aylesford Paper Mills, a game in which Charlie Barnard scored 5 goals – a then post-war club single match record.

Charlie Walker was succeeded in the summer of 1951 as player-coach by another ex-Margate man, Ken Horrigan. He took the team to the 1951–52 Kent League Cup final where they lost 3–0 to home-team Folkestone.

In January 1953 club manager Joe Fagg announced his intention to resign and two months later David Nelson was brought in from Crystal Palace as player-manager Former player-coach Horrigan continued playing in the first team that season and remained with the club, latterly mainly playing in the reserves, until 1954. In June 1953, having enjoyed an extended seven year rent free period, the club became the owners of Essella Park when they purchased the freehold from Fred Norman for the same amount he had paid for it in 1946.

Until Nelson became manager the team had recorded upper mid-table positions in the Kent League but in the first of his two full seasons at the helm (1953–54) Nelson's team finished 14th of 16 teams and recorded only 5 wins from 30 games – the lowest win percentage in the club's Kent League campaigns. This included a run from November 1953 of only one win in the last 21 league matches of the season (W1; D7; L13). Only 34 goals were scored over the 30 game league campaign with Alan Smith top-scorer with 6. There was little improvement the following season and despite Nelson being offered a contract for the next 1955–56 season he resigned in May 1955 having accepted a coaching position abroad.

He was replaced for the player-manager role from within the club on a part-time basis by Harry Freeman who re-jigged the playing staff – bringing in younger players after the club had cut wages towards the end of the previous season. His single season tenure of 1955–56 continued the run of lower/mid table finishes and first team gates slumped almost 40% to below 1,300 (whilst the Division 2 winning reserves had gates of 1,000) which created a financial loss and put the club in debt. The following season team matters were presided over by a Management Committee with a mid-league table outcome. Towards the end of that 1956–57 season there was a win-less run of eight successive Kent League matches (D1; L7) (expanded to nine including a Kent Senior Cup match loss) which included a then post-war record of six successive league losses. A bright spot was top-scorer Ron Vigar who recorded 21 goals from 27 league outings.

The 1957–58 season saw the appointment of ex-Leyton Orient and Southampton full-back Ted Ballard as player manager. A poor first season which included a run of 16 league matches with only two (back to back) wins (W2; D2; L12), incorporating a run of six straight league losses, resulted in a 16th of 18 teams final league position. Ron Vigar was responsible for 21 of the 53 league goals scored. Despite lack of league success in his five years at the club Ballard guided the 'Nuts and Bolts' to notable cup achievements.

In the 1958–59 season the team (and an Ashford club for a first time since 1893) won the Kent Senior Cup. Kent League Ashford beat Southern League Tonbridge in the final at Gillingham watched by 5,061 spectators. Ron Vigar scored both goals in a 2–1 victory, the marker from Tonbridge being the only goal conceded by Ashford in their five matches in the competition; Tonbridge had hit both the crossbar and the post (from a penalty shot) during the game. Although over the league campaign Vigar notched 20 goals (his third successive with at least 20) he was outranked as top scorer by Jimmy Jenkins on 22.

Earlier that 1958–59 season the team reached the FA Cup First Round proper for first time since 1934. At the start of the cup run in the preliminary round the club produced their all-time record FA cup win with a 10–1 home victory over Betteshanger CW – with both Jimmy Jenkins and Gordon Burden recording hat-tricks. The 'Town' then battled through four qualifying rounds culminating in a 4th qualifying round home replay victory over Southern League club Hastings United to reach the First Round proper. For this tie they hosted Football League Division 4 club Crystal Palace in front of an Essella Park record of 6,525 spectators, losing narrowly 1–0. The match was refereed by a youthful Jack Taylor who climaxed his career as referee at the 1974 World Cup Final. This season was the first of four consecutive appearances by Ashford (who remained managed by Ted Ballard throughout this time) in the 'proper' rounds of the FA Cup. For each of these years they would ultimately fall to teams from the Football League.

==== Southern League Division 1 (1959–1971) ====
The Kent League which had been in existence since 1894 with Ashford United as founder members, was disbanded in 1959. Consequently, Ashford Town joined-up to the Southern League for the 1959–60 season, the first of a 44-year membership. The 'Town' were incorporated into the newly formed Division One (the second level of the Southern League) together with seven clubs from the Kent League, (Folkestone, Ramsgate, Margate, Dover, Bexleyleath and Welling, Tunbridge Wells and Sittingbourne). Additionally the league comprised the rumps of the former Southern League South East and North West Divisions together with two additional new recruits, Hinckley Athletic and Romford. Away matches for the team involved more extensive travelling with trips to amongst others Exeter City Reserves, Merthyr Tydfil, Kidderminster, Burton Albion and Cambridge City. The 'Nuts and Bolts' first match in the new league on 22 August 1959 and was a then post-war Ashford record reverse 1–8 at fellow newcomers Hinckley Athletic. Four days later playing the other newly recruited club Romford at Essella Park Ashford notched their first points courtesy of a 1–0 victory (scorer: Don Murfet). The team finished 14th of 22 clubs in the league in a campaign during which they suffered, for the third season in the last four, a six consecutive league match losing streak during an eight match league win-less sequence (D1; L7).

The 1959–60 season witnessed the team's second successive appearance in the First round proper of the FA Cup: after successfully negotiating four qualifying matches including, in the last of these, winning away at Southern Premier League team Gravesend and Northfleet the reward was match at Football League Third Division Brentford. The result was a 0–1 defeat in front of a crowd of 13,900 – the largest single match crowd to see the 'Town' play. In making this round of the cup once again Ashford Town were awarded full membership of The Football Association.

But 1959 was not all about action on the pitch. The club became a Limited Company; but a more visible milestone was the appearance of floodlighting at the Essella Road ground. The installation of the 'Do it Yourself' floodlighting was perhaps the best example of voluntary effort at the club. The self designed and installed system comprised eight 40-foot high towers each housing four 2,000 watt lamps and had required an up-rated power supply to be laid to the ground. The overall cost was £1,507.10s.5d. During their 28-year lifetime it is reported that only one match was not completed owing to non-working floodlights – caused by mains power failure. The lights were officially switched on with a Grand Opening Floodlight Game on Monday 19 October 1959 with First Division Chelsea the visitors. England forward and football legend Jimmy Greaves scored four goals in a 7–2 victory for the Londoners, with Ron Vigar and Gordon Burden netting for the home side.

The club's exploits were curtailed once again in the First Round proper of the 1960–61 FA Cup: after a single qualifying victory (an away replay win at Margate), the journey was brought to an end by a 1–2 home loss (Town scorer: Joe White) to Division 4 League club Gillingham. On the Gills team-sheet was forward John Shepherd who played for and skippered Ashford the following season. The cup run in that 1961–62 season was the next high-point in Ashford Town's history when the club reached, for the first time, the FA Cup Second Round Proper. Following a fourth round qualifying home win over Dover the first round match-up saw Ashford play a goal-less draw at non-league (Isthmian League) Wycombe Wanderers then winning the replay at Essella Park 3–0 (scorers Joe White, Ron Clayton & John Shepherd). In the Second Round the 'Nuts and Bolts' lost 0–3 on home turf to Football League Division 3 Queens Park Rangers – playing for the visitors was Keith Rutter who would subsequently return to Ashford three years later to captain the team.

In mid-March 1962 it was announced that manager Ballard, who had over a year remaining on his contract, was leaving the club to move on to Hastings United. Taking over coaching responsibilities on a part-time basis for the remainder of the season was former player and current trainer Bert Sibley – with club management to be handled by the club committee. Shortly after Sibley took the reins the team created an Ashford Town record with a run of a six consecutive drawn league matches (increasing to nine by including draws in two legged Kent Floodlit final games and the first leg of the Kent Senior Cup final). The team went on to win the Kent Floodlight Cup, beating Southern League Premier Tonbridge 2–1 away in a second leg replay (having drawn 1–1 in the first leg at Essella Park and 2–2 away in the second). In the Kent Senior Cup final 'the Nuts and Bolts' were eventually beaten 1–4 by Dover – after an aggregate 2–2 draw over two ties the decider for the 1961–62 competition was unusually contested at the start of the following 1962–63 season by a much changed Ashford team, watched by a little over three thousand spectators on neutral territory at Folkestone.

Under Sibley the team started the actual 1962–63 season with a run of seven consecutive win-less league matches (D3; L4) and recorded only one win over the next six games giving aggregate figures of P13; W1: D4; L8. The team finished 18th from 20 teams in the league with only nine wins all season and losing all of their last six league matches. They put the poor league form behind them in the last match of the season and lifted the Kent Senior Cup for a third time by beating Margate 1–0 in the final played at Gillingham, with former England Youth player Brian Dellar notching the decider.

The next two seasons each saw single match Southern League goals record matches for the 'Nuts and Bolts'. The first was in February 1964 when the team thrashed Barry Town 10–1 (goals from with John Harris, Lawrie Thomson, Bob Walker(2), Malcolm Collins, Paul Nicholas(3), Alec Garden and John Smith). Despite team strength being hampered by financial constraints the team achieved an eleven-year best seventh-place finish in the 1963–64 league. Less palatable during the following season, in which the team slumped to 17th in the final table, playing their third game in six days in a mid-week match in November 1964 the team crumbled to a post-war record 0–8 defeat at Crawley Town.

A further upshot of the disbanding of the Kent League was that the Reserve team also had to find another League in which to compete. In 1959–60 they were founder members of the Seanglian League (in effect a reserves section of the Aetolian League which itself comprised mostly disenfranchised former Kent League clubs). The second string team were runners-up in the 1960–61 Seanglian League Cup losing the final at home 0–1 to Dover Reserves. The reserves team were champions of the 12 team Seanglian League in 1961–62 and came close to a treble but lost the Seanglian League Cup final 1–5 over two matches ( h:0–2; a:1–3) to Leyton Orient ‘A’ team and lost 2–3 at home to Slade Green in the final of the Kent Intermediate Cup. Two years later in 1963–64 the Seanglian League morphed into the Metropolitan & District League Division 2 and the reserves endured a poor season with only five wins from 28 league matches – this included a run from December to the season's end of only one win from 17 league matches (W1; D5; L11) and only 31 goals scored over the 28 match season. In 1966–67 the Reserves joined the newly formed Kent Premier League.

Although the club had for many years played in green and white, from the mid-sixties for three seasons they adopted tangerine and white for their team colours before reverting to their former colours in 1968–69.

Sibley's tenure ended after the final match of the 1964–65 season; it had been announced (prematurely) that Allan Sanders was to take over as manager however Ashford were unwilling to pay the £3,000 fee demanded from his current club Brighton & Hove Albion. Subsequently, prior to the start of the 1965–66 season the club appointed ex-England and Chelsea full back and First Division championship medal holder Peter Sillett as player-manager. The new manager's first season was the worst to date in the Southern League with 9 wins, 10 draws and 27 losses over the 46 game league season and for the first time for Ashford Town the team scored an average of less than 1 goal per league game with 44 goals – failing to net in thirteen matches. The 'Nuts and Bolts' finished 23rd from 24 clubs.

In the following 1966–67 season's FA Cup the 'Nuts and Bolts' battled through four qualifying rounds (beating in the last Sillett's previous club Southern League Premier Guildford City in a replay at Essella Park) to reach the first round proper where they defeated another Southern League Premier outfit Cambridge City 4–1 (2 goals each from Tim Soutar & Jim Roberts). For the club's second ever appearance in the Second Round they were drawn away to Football League Third Division Swindon Town. The initial tie on the Saturday was postponed owing to frozen pitch at the County Ground. The re-arranged fixture provided no respite however with Ashford falling 5–0 to Swindon.

Two years later during the 1968–69 campaign the 'Nuts and Bolts' had their best run in the Southern League Cup competition and reached the semi-finals; they were eliminated 3–2 at Southern League Premier Division (and that season's League and Cup double winners) Cambridge United.

In the early part of the 1969–70 season victories in the first three FA Cup qualifying rounds gave supporters hope of a run into the proper rounds of the FA Cup, but this was quashed by a home defeat in the 4th qualifying round to the previous season's Athenian League Premier Division champions Walton & Hersham. The main prize however crystallised at the season's end. Throughout its Southern League tenure and during Sillett's previous three seasons the 'Nuts and Bolts' had been a mid/lower table team – their previous high point was seventh in 1963–64. But in 1969–70 under the manager Sillett this was eclipsed by a fourth-placed finish – a position that was rewarded with promotion to the Southern League Premier Division. Whilst the number of League matches won that campaign was not significantly greater than the previous few seasons the team was better defensively and conceded fewer goals and lost fewer matches with a new club low of an average of one goal per game being conceded per league match by ever present goalkeeper Dave Hills. It was additionally the first season since 1958–59 that a 'Town' player, Bobby Laverick (who quit the club at the seasons end), scored in excess of 20 goals (with 21 from his 36 matches). With sixteen draws from forty-two matches played (W19; D16; L7) the 'Nuts and Bolts' were the league leaders for drawn games – the season had started with an unbeaten nine match run of which six were drawn and three won. This promotion was a big step up for the club and represents their highest placing in the football pyramid; they were only one division below the Football League – indeed the 1969–70 Southern Premier champions, Cambridge United, had been elected to the Football League Fourth Division (there being no automatic promotion at this time).

Ashford's first match in the 1970–71 Southern League Premier Division was a 1–1 draw at home to Weymouth with Ashford equalising through Terry Street with the last kick of the match. Two days later Ashford (extremely) briefly topped the table courtesy of a 1–3 win at Margate. Notable during the campaign were the players who appeared between the posts: the previous season's ‘keeper David Hills ceased playing early in the season; for one match former 1950s Chelsea goalie, Bill Robertson appeared; new custodian Brian Gambrill signed-on for £300 from Canterbury City and conceded seven goals on his home debut in a 7–1 loss to Worcester City – Ashford's lone marker was scored by David Gillingwater, a former Chelsea FA Youth Cup winner and England Youth international; mid-season Gambrill was injured and for three matches local amateur 'keeper Reg Gorham stepped in (echoing the make-up of the original Ashford United club he worked for a local newspaper). The latter back-stopped the team to a 4–2 home win against Hillingdon Borough to snap a 13 league game win-less run (D4; L9). Later in the campaign the team endured a sequence of one win in fourteen league matches (W1; D5; L8). With only eight wins all season and the highest goals conceded in the league (86) the 'Town' finished 20th (from 22 teams) and were thus relegated. Despite the lacklustre league campaign the team had progressed to the Kent Senior Cup semi-final, but lost the tie 4–3 away to Dover.

==== Southern League Division 1 South (1971–1979) ====
The demotion from the Southern Premier put Ashford in the now regionalised Southern League Division One South for 1971–72. After a slow start and a twelve league match mid-season slump (W1; D2; L9) the 'Nuts and Bolts' recorded a 10th-placed finish. The same season the Reserves reached the final of the Kent League Division One Cup but where defeated by Chatham in the final.

The following season in the 1972–73 FA Trophy the club had their best ever non-league knock-out cup run. After battling through seven ties (including three qualifying rounds), the last of which was a 3–2 away win at Bangor City of the Northern Premier League, the 'Nuts and Bolts' reached the semi-finals – just one match from a Wembley final. Alas the dream was not to be: in a match played on neutral turf at Peterborough they lost 1–0 to a disputed second half penalty to Northern Premier League club Scarborough (who would themselves go on to win the trophy). Ironically for a club so linked to the railways, supporters travelling on a special train arrived 15 minutes after the kick-off following a delay en route.

In the league, the Southern League Division One South, after a good run in their final 13 league matches (W9, D2; L2) Ashford finished third, one place below the promotion places. In all competitions Alan Morton set a club record scoring 46 goals in 59 games (31 from 36 league matches), which stood for 42 years until broken in the 2014–15 season – his haul included a sequence of scoring in eight (all league games) consecutive matches, and excluding the intervening FA trophy semi-final game this run expands to scoring sixteen goals in nine consecutive league matches. At the other end of the pitch it was the first ever season that 'Town' conceded fewer that an average of one goal per league match with ever-present 'keeper Gambrill being beaten only 40 times over the 42 league games which included seventeen clean sheets.

There were two other notable events from the 1972–73 the season. Firstly Roy Hodgson, who has since had a distinguished club and country managerial career, including the England team manager for four years, played for the 'Town'. Secondly the club took part in European football in the appropriately named Cross Channel Competition. Teams from French towns near the coast (Boulogne, Saint-Omer and Hazebrouck) played similarly positioned English clubs (Ashford, Folkestone and Dover). Ashford fulfilled all their continental away and one home fixture but the competition fizzled out owing to fixture congestion resulting from the long cup runs which was exacerbated by bad weather and power blackouts (from industrial disputes in the UK).

Around the early seventies the club began looking for a new home stadium and favoured relocation to a site adjacent to the local authority's leisure complex close to Ashford town centre. However nothing was agreed and the search for new premises wasn't resolved until towards the end of the next decade.

During the 1973–74 season long-time manager Peter Sillett resigned in December 1973 and moved to Folkestone and was replaced by Dennis Hunt who moved in the opposite direction having earlier been sacked by Folkestone. Dennis had been a member of the Gillingham team that defeated Ashford in the FA cup in 1960–61.

A modicum of cup success was achieved in the 1974–75 campaign. Ashford won through five rounds (winning the last of these at soon to be promoted Southern League South Division club Hillingdon Borough) to reach the FA Cup First round proper, with a home tie against Division 3 outfit Walsall. Owing to a waterlogged pitch the scheduled Saturday fixture was postponed and moved to mid-week. The match was played on the following Wednesday afternoon as Ashford's floodlights were deemed not of the required standard for an evening game. In front of a modest but enthusiastic crowd of 2,623 (that included many schoolboys allowed the afternoon off from their schools) Ashford lost to Walsall 1–3 ('Town' scorer: John Hold). There was a ripple of performance too in the Kent Senior Cup where the team reached the 1974–75 semi-finals losing 3–1 to Southern League Premier Division Maidstone United. Dennis Hunt left in January 1975 after just one year in charge as manager and was replaced by former Ashford Reserves and Herne Bay Manager Reg Elliott. He spent only eleven months at the helm: during his tenure first-choice goalkeeper Tony Godden was transferred for a very modest £1,500 fee to West Bromwich Albion who, with him playing his part, would come close to lifting the Football League League Winners Trophy in 1979. Across two half-seasons for the 'Nuts and Bolts' Godden had kept 14 clean sheets in 40 league matches played including five successively early in the 1974–75 season.

In February 1976 after a couple of months with former manager Peter Sillett in charge as caretaker Bobby Nash took up the player/manager reins. The club had recorded mid-table finishes in the previous three campaigns but things worsened in Nash's first full season in charge of 1976–77. The club hit the local press for all the wrong reasons early in 1977 with a story that the club was £23,000 in debt and two weeks from bankruptcy. There followed a drastic reorganisation and effort both on and off the field which over several years restored financial equilibrium. League performance in 1976–77 was the worst recorded as a Southern League team with 5 wins, 8 draws and 21 losses over the 34 league games. This included both a failure to win any of their first 11 matches (D3; L8) which included two League Cup matches and, later in the campaign, a 13 league game win-less sequence (D3; L10) which included a club record seven consecutive match losing streak. The team finished 17th from 18 clubs in the division. There was though a Kent Senior Cup semi-final contested by the team, this ended in a 3–2 home defeat by Bromley who were the eventual cup winners.

In April 1978 in the midst of a 14 league match sequence that returned only one win (W1; D5; L8) Gordon Burden replaced Bobby Nash as player-manager. Gordon had first played for the club in 1954–55 and he was in his fourth stint as a 'Town' player. On-going financial constraints limited performances and lowly league finishes continued. In the 1978–79 season there was a run of six consecutive league match defeats and the team scored an all-time record low of 28 league goals from their 40 league matches (in 18 of which they failed to score). Top league scorers with 6 apiece were Tony Smith and Peter McRobert – over the next twenty years Peter made a club record 819 appearances (59 as a substitute) for the 'Nuts and Bolts'. In all competitions the team scored 35 goals from their total of 46 matches. Dave Clay top-scored with 8.

==== Southern League Southern Division (1979–1999) ====
In 1979–80 there was a major reorganisation of non-league football with the creation in of the Alliance Premier League (the forerunner to the Football Conference and National League) which comprised the top clubs from both the Southern and Northern Premier Leagues. The Southern League itself was reorganised into a Southern and a Midland Division (with no Premier Division), with Ashford Town placed in the Southern section.

With the club maintaining its stringent financial policies and with stronger former Southern Premier teams (who hadn't made the cut into the Alliance) making up part of the opposition lower bottom half league finishes continued for the 'Town' team. There was an eleven league match win-less sequence in 1979–80 (D5; L6) and the 1980–81 campaign finished with only one win in the final 18 league matches (W1; D8; L9). There was some light however as the team reached the Kent Senior Cup final for two years in succession in 1980–81 and 1981–82. On neither occasion were the team able to bring home the silverware, losing to Alliance Premier League teams Gravesend & Northfleet (2–0) and Maidstone United (3–0) respectively.

The Southern Premier Division was re-introduced for the 1982–83 season, with regional-based Southern and Midland leagues below. Ashford Town remained in the Southern Division and although ostensibly staying in the same league this was a slide down the football pyramid – now being in the third level below the Football League – the team had not played below at least the second level for 23 years. The 'Nuts and Bolts' finished eight in the league table; John Young was the leading league scorer with 22 goals from 32 matches.

The club also recorded an eighth-place finish in the 1983–84 season and contested the semi-finals of the Courage Eastern Floodlit Cup, losing to Essex League club Stansted 2–3 on a penalty shoot-out after the sides had drawn a two legged semi-final 3–3 – Stansted were having a stellar season and completed a cup quadruple of the Eastern Floodlit Cup itself, the Essex Senior League Cup, the East Anglian Cup and most prestigiously the FA Vase. Earlier in the campaign Ashford had won through four FA Cup ties to reach the fourth qualifying round where they were defeated 0–3 at Isthmian Premier League Barking. During the season John Young was once again the leading league scorer with 24 goals from 38 league matches and the leading scorer over all the season's 59 matches notching 42 goals – close to matching the 46 goal record of Alan Morton set 12 years previously.

For 1984–85 Chris Weller replaced Burden as manager – a slump to 17th position with half of the league matches lost brought an end to Wellers' managerial reign just prior to the end of his one season in charge; previous manager Peter Sillett was reappointed in his place.

The turnaround from 18th position in the first full season of Sillett's second managerial spell in 1985–86 to League runners-up and promotion a year later in 1986–87 was striking. The promotion was founded on a tight defensive unit who conceded only 32 goals – the fewest in any season by Ashford Town and the all-time lowest goals conceded to games ratio (the previous two lowest were both by Sillet managed 'Town' teams). The team kept 19 clean sheets in the league: Keith Hepple kept 15 from the 33 league games in which he played (including five consecutive in February 1987) and Warren Scott four from his five matches; there was too a run of seven league matches without a loss (W6; D1). Sillett was the first manager to pilot the club to promotion since he initially achieved the feat back in 1969–70 campaign. The season also saw the 'Nuts and Bolts' contest a Kent Senior Cup semi-final, a 1–0 home defeat to eventual cup winners Dartford. Working with Sillet in the role of club trainer in both promotion seasons and in the intervening seasons too was George Sergeant. The former Irish Cup winner had previously played for the 'Town', joining from Hastings in 1952 and would fill the 'man with the magic wet sponge' role for many more years yet! completing a total of 52 years service to the club.

But the 1986–87 season wasn't all about promotion: it marked the season the club bid farewell to Essella Park as their home after 56 years. The final game on 2 May 1987 was a title decider against Dorchester Town, the 0–0 result meant the Dorset club pipped Ashford to the league title by one point. The current ground was in a residential district and hemmed in by houses and the club had been looking to relocate for over 15 years and had looked at 17 sites. The directors purchased a plot of land for £80,000 a few miles beyond the immediate boundaries of the town in Kingsnorth and although they felt this was "not the ideal site" they could find nothing within the Town boundary. The seventy acre plot was undeveloped at the time of the final fixture at Essella Park; planning permission for the new 'Homelands' stadium was yet to be granted – the chairman of the directors was critical of "constant delays" by an "unhelpful" Ashford Council. The club were therefore without a home stadium: they agreed a ground-share at long time rivals Folkestone for the next two years.

With the 1986–87 promotion the 'Nuts and Bolts' moved-up to the Southern Premier League – now sponsored by Beazer Homes. Manager Peter Sillett left for Poole Town immediately following the promotion. His assistant Nicky Sparks took the helm for a season and despite a mid-season run of one win and eleven draws in eighteen matches (W1; D11; L6) achieved a creditable mid-table finish. Chris Weller was reappointed for the following 1988–89 season: the club finished 18th, one place above the four Southern Premier League relegation places with the personal milestone of 20 league goals in a season being achieved by Dave Arter from his 41 matches.

The team returned to Ashford for 1989–90 season with the opening of the Homelands stadium – this boasted a capacity of 3,300 spectators with 500 seated. But it wasn't an auspicious inaugural season: Ashford, still managed by Weller, finished 19th of 22 teams and were consequently relegated back to the Southern Division. In the final 19 league matches there were 17 defeats (W1; D1; L17): these included a run of five consecutive league matches in which the team failed to score – this was part of a run of seven scoreless matches which included two Cup matches, one of which was a 560-mile round trip Premier Inter League Cup match at that seasons Northern Premier League runaway Champions Colne Dynamoes.

The mid to late 1980s saw a run of near misses for the Reserves squad. In the Kent League Division 2 they were runners-up for four seasons: in 1984–85 to Sheppey United; in 1987–88 to Fisher Athletic; in 1988–89 to Hythe Town; and in 1990–91 to Canterbury City (courtesy of third ranked Dover having three points deducted). They had also been losing finalists in the 1986–87 Division 2 League Cup 0–1 at home to Sittingbourne.

In the early 1990s there were several big-money and record transfers: in late 1990 forward partnership Jeff Ross and Dave Arter were sold to Hythe Town for a combined fee of £25,000 – a club record single receipt; three years later in 1993 a single player record of £20,000 was received from Sittingbourne for Lee McRobert; and the following year a record of £7,000 was paid by Ashford to Sittingbourne to bring Dave Arter and Jeff Ross back to Ashford. Arter holds the club record for scoring with 196 goals from 381 plus 14 substitute appearances: he commenced playing as an 18 year old in August 1983 and took 46 matches until December 1985 to score his first goal for the club.

For the 1990–91 season in the Southern Division the 'Town' came under player-manager Neil Cugley who came in from Folkestone. He had previously been player-manager at Hythe Town, winning the 1988–89 Kent League championship. For the first five seasons of Cugley's tenure the fans saw a series of comfortable top ten league finishes. During this period the old cup spirit of the 'Nuts and Bolts' stirred: in 1991–92 they lost out in a Kent Senior Cup semi final 1–0 at Hythe; the following 1992–93 season they fought through four FA Cup ties to reach the fourth qualifying round where they were defeated 2–1 at home by Conference League outfit Slough Town; later that season the team collected some silverware being victorious in the Kent Senior Cup final beating Isthmian League Premier Bromley 3–2 with Andy Pearson and Lee McRobert (2) netting – the latter was the clubs league top-scorer that season with 27 goals from playing all 42 matches; in 1993–94 the 'Nuts and Bolts' reached the semi-finals of the Eastern Floodlit Cup, but were soundly beaten 2–6 at Braintree Town – paying the price for the heavy toll of fixtures at the climax of the season, this match being their fifth game in ten days. That 1993–94 league campaign saw the 'Nuts and Bolts' finish in sixth place in the Southern Division, their results included a run between the 8th February and the season's end during which they lost only once in 22 league matches (W13; D8; L1). Nicky Dent was the club's highest league goal-scorer with 21 from 32 matches, closely followed by Mark Stanton who notched 20 from 39.

There followed for the first time in 20 years three seasons with the appearance of Ashford Town in the ‘proper’ rounds of the FA Cup – manager Neil Cugley had been a non-playing member of Ashford's squad in their last appearance in the First Round in 1974–75.

In the first of these in 1994–95 the team won through 5 preliminary/qualifying rounds, culminating with a triumph at Salisbury City, to reach the First Round proper. The resultant home tie against Fulham was watched by a Homelands record crowd of 3,363. On a heavy waterlogged pitch, in a match televised by Sky TV, Neil Cugley's side achieved a more than creditable 2–2 draw against their Third Division opponents. Ashford took a two-goal lead (through Jeff Ross and Dave Arter) before two late controversial penalties both converted by Micky Adams rescued the league team. In the replay at Craven Cottage the 'Nuts and Bolts' took the match to extra time but ultimately succumbed 5–3 (with goals from Mark Stanton(2) and Nicky Dent).

That 1994–95 season marked only the second time in post-war football that Ashford scored in excess of 100 league goals – their 106 was second only to the 109 scored by the 1948–49 Kent League winning team. The team scored a total of 151 goals in all 59 competitive matches, with Dave Arter banging in 45 in his 55 appearances (one shy of Alan Morton's 1972–73 club record); 35 of Arter's goals were from his 42 league appearances including four league hat-tricks. Arter scored eleven of his league goals in three of the final four matches of the season, notching two quadruples and a triple; these matches formed part of a run of seven consecutive league matches won by the 'Nuts and Bolts' (with an aggregate score of 26–7), this being a post-war league win record equalling sequence (with the 1948–49 season). Mark Stanton, who missed the season end through injury, tallied 35 goals from 46 appearances including an Ashford Town post-war record-equalling (with Charlie Barnard from 1950) single game haul of five, in a 6–1 Southern League Cup victory at Erith & Belvedere, and a total of nine in the seven match FA Cup run. A mid season run of eight draws in an eleven-game sequence (W2; D8; L1) – which included 5–5 scoreline at Newport on the Isle of Wight – contributed to the 5th placed league finish.

In the 1995–96 FA Cup, after disposing of Isthmian League Division 1 Aldershot Town at home in the final of four qualifying rounds, the First Round draw saw Ashford away at their fellow Isthmian League club Bognor Regis Town. Ashford achieved a 1–1 draw on the south coast but then lost 0–1 at home in the replay. The match was a complete anti-climax; after being delayed by a power cut, Carlton Wynter then hit the post in the opening minute – the hosts just knew it just wasn't going to be their night. This was the first time the club had been knocked out in the 'proper' rounds of the FA Cup by a fellow non-league team. Perhaps fate was trying to save the supporters the trauma of a trip to Peterborough (the scene of the 1972–73 FA Trophy semi-final defeat) who awaited the winner in the next round.

The 1995–96 season was a successful campaign for the 'Town' in other competitions. On the county cup front they won the Kent Senior Cup beating Charlton 3–0 in the final with goals from Dave Arter, Andy Allon and Matt Carruthers. And most importantly in the league they won promotion to the Southern League Premier Division as a result of the team's second-placed finish to Sittingbourne in the Southern Division with a record of W25; D9; L8 over the 42-game season: Arter scored 25 of the 75 league goals scored; 44 league goals were conceded, there were 18 clean sheets courtesy of goalie Maurice Munden from his 41 matches.

For the third FA Cup run, in the 1996–97 season, after a single qualifying round home win over Isthmian League Premier club Kingstonian, the First Round tie saw Ashford again encounter Isthmian Premier opposition in the form of Dagenham And Redbridge. Following a 2–2 draw on home turf Ashford visited the 'Daggers' for the replay: the match ended 1–1 with Ashford progressing to the second round with a 4–3 penalty shoot-out win with the vital penalty scored by Paul Chambers (who would later become Ashford United manager). In the Second Round Ashford were drawn away at Watford. The 'Nuts and Bolts' matched their higher ranked opponents in a goalless first-half, but the Vicarage Road side eventually ran out 5–0 winners.

The club's return season to the Southern League Premier Division (now with the sponsor Dr Martens) in 1996–97 was a struggle, the league results included a 15 match sequence without a win (D7; L8). With a finishing position of 19th (ensured only by winning their last two league matches) the club was only saved from relegation by the resignation of Sudbury Town. This precipitated the end of Neil Cugley's seven year managerial reign (he moved on to Folkestone Invicta) and he was replaced by Nigel Donn who had joined the playing staff the previous season from Dover Athletic. The results for the following 1997–98 campaign were worse, 29 losses from 42 matches was the highest loss ratio experienced by the Ashford Town club. This included a mid-season run of 10 league matches without a win (D2; L8) followed shortly afterwards by a club record equalling sequence of 7 consecutive league game losses which included 5 consecutive in which the 'Town' failed to score. The team scored only 34 league goals and failed to score in 19 matches: two players, Paul Chambers and Lee Lough top-scoring with 4 goals each. Unsurprisingly relegation couldn't be evaded and 21st place (from 22 teams) saw the Town return to the Southern Division for the following 1998–99 season where they finished 7th in the 22 team league.

But the big news for 1998 was not the relegation but rather the news of a take-over of the indebted club by a consortium headed by former England forward Rodney Marsh. In addition to clearing the club debts they planned a development of the Homelands site. The deal ultimately collapsed but the ownership of the freehold of Homelands became separated from the football operation. As a safeguard a trust of former club directors placed a covenant on the Homelands site which stipulated if it was sold for development that a new stadium had to be built. Another ownership consortium, fronted by John Gurney, surfaced but they became unable to continue financing the club. The Ashford Town club survived when Tim Thorogood acquired it in 2001 with a lease arrangement being struck with the owners of the Homelands freehold.

==== Southern League Eastern Division (1999–2004) ====
The league had undertaken another reorganisation and renaming exercise for 1999–2000 and Ashford now competed as a Southern League, Division One Eastern team. During all the ownership upheaval there was a merry-go-round of managers. During the 1998–99 campaign in January 1999 Nigel Donn was succeeded by George Wakeling from Bromley. The club engaged former England international Paul Parker as director of football. In the 1999–2000 season he and Wakeling had the team topping the league table in late autumn of 1999 – after losing two of their first four league matches the team embarked on an unbeaten 14 league match sequence (W11; D3); this run included an all-time Ashford FC record equalling (from 1938 to 1939) eight consecutive single season league wins, in which 21 goals were scored whilst only 4 conceded. During this part of the campaign Lee McRobert emulated Ted Wells (from 1948 to 1949) by scoring in nine consecutive matches (eight of which were league games). Amidst the turmoil of the takeover things took a nosedive for Messrs Wakeling & Parker and after a run of just one win in seven league games the pair were sacked on 10 January 2000. They were replaced for the remainder of the season by Tony Reynolds and despite a late season seven league match undefeated run (W5; D2) the earlier slump meant the team finished in sixth place in the 22 team league table.

From the 2000–01 season, in order to differentiate it from the similarly named club from Ashford, Middlesex, the 'Nuts and Bolts' official club name was extended to Ashford Town (Kent). In the campaign the new manager was Tommy Sampson (who had taken Deal Town to victory in the FA vase final the previous season) and the team advanced to the 4th round (the last 32) of the FA trophy. They were defeated in Weymouth 1–3 to end 'Town's' best run in the competition since 1972–73. Under Sampson league form was mediocre (W14; D1; L13) (this included an unbeaten run (W5; D1) in his final six final league matches in charge) and Tim Thorogood, who now owned the club, assumed team management for the final third of the season. During his tenure there was only one win from their last 14 league matches (W1; D3; L10). The team recorded a mid-table final league position: as a measure of the disruption encountered during the campaign there were 51 players who appeared in the 'Town' shirt over the 42 league matches.

The 2001–02 campaign started in the same vein as the previous one ended with only one win in the first ten games (W1; D1; L8) and the team finished 14th from 22 teams but only seven points above the bottom spot. The team reached the semi-finals of the Kent Senior Cup where they were on the wrong end of a heavy 5–0 defeat at Football Conference club Margate.

For 2002–03 the team moved away from their green and white strip and played in lime green shirts and blue shorts. The team finished 11th from 22 teams and it was the last season in which an Ashford Town player notched 20 league goals with Adrian Stone reaching that number from his 36 matches played. The 2003–04 league season started with a nine match unbeaten run (W5; D4): the last of these games was the first of five consecutive without scoring. Subsequent inconsistent results led to a 12th placed league ranking. This season marked Ashford's final one as a member of the Southern League after 44 years under their umbrella – there was more reorganisation afoot of the non-league scene.

==== Isthmian League Division One / Southern Division (2004–2010) ====
The 2004–05 season reorganisation was brought about by the introduction of a North and South regional Conference leagues below the Premier. There was also the establishment of boundaries between the Southern and Isthmian leagues (which hitherto had overlapped). As a result, Ashford Town were allocated to the Ryman sponsored Isthmian League Division One. This was a further demotion down the non-league structure, with the club's new league referred to as 'step 4' of non-league football (i.e. four levels below the Football League).

In September 2004 owner/manager Tim Thorogood appointed former England player Terry Fenwick as manager. He quit four months later claiming a vast turnover of players had not allowed a settled squad: thirty-five players had been used during a run of poor results of just two wins in 16 league matches (W2; D6: L8). Thorogood resumed as manager and the team, who failed to score in 15 of 42 league matches, finished the season 20th of 22 teams.

Supporters concerns for the existence of the club were raised in the summer of 2005 by a carry-over from the takeover/ground ownership saga of a few years previously; it was claimed the club had not paid rent (of £2,500pa) for three years and additionally had £12,000 unpaid arrears with the Inland Revenue. The issues were subsequently all resolved and Thorogood remained in control of the club. Under the joint managership of himself and John Cumberbatch team performances in the league in 2005–06 continued in a poor vein with only 2 wins in the team's first 23 league games (W2; D7; L14). Over the 44 league match campaign just 41 goals were scored: there were 17 games in which the team failed to score and a near record 7–0 thrashing at Horsham. The 'Town' ended the league campaign as 21st from 23 teams.

For the following season the there was further league reorganisation and the Isthmian replaced its single Division One with two regional divisions with 'Nuts and Bolts' in the Southern division for 2006–07. There was a managerial change in October when John Cumberbatch was appointed sole manager from the role of joint-manager he had held the previous season. The league finish, incorporating a mid-season run of one win in 15 league matches (W1; D4; L10), was poor (18th from 22 teams) but there was a Kent Senior Cup semi-final contested (a 5–0 heavy home defeat by Isthmian Premier Bromley). Success was achieved though by the back-room staff led by Elaine Osbourne who won an award for the division's best club match day programme.

March 2007 saw further changes in ownership of the club. Tim Thorogood sold to a new joint-ownership team of Tony Betteridge and Don Crosbie. They had acquired the freehold interest in the Homelands site in 2006 and crucially this transaction reunited ownership of the club and stadium. They also announced that Arsenal and England striker Ian Wright was to become director of football strategy at the club.

The start of the 2007–08 season saw former Northampton Town and Dover manager Clive Walker appointed as manager and the team returned to a green and white strip. The directors reported they had spent half a million pounds in refurbishing the Homelands facilities. Despite a respectable record over his 12 league game matches in charge (W5; D4; L3) Walker didn't last long and he was replaced as manager at the end of October by former Wales International Steve Lovell. He oversaw a sequence of only one loss in the final eleven league matches (W8; D1; L1) and eighth position in the final table.

There was minor triumph for the club in 2007–08 with the Reserve team winning the Kent League 2 Cup (defeating Dartford) and finishing as Kent League Division 2 runners-up (to Dover).

Lovell's first full season in charge of 2008–09, when the team again finished eighth in the league, featured a team best since the league winners of 1948–49: an unbeaten league match run of fifteen matches (W:9; D:6) which included a seven match winning streak. But most of the action over the next couple of years seasons took place off the field. In the summer of 2008 Director Crosbie announced plans for a Sports Village at Homelands. But within a year the relationship between the joint-owners Betteridge and Crosbie turned sour and a year later the boardroom dispute escalated. The split in the boardroom affected the on-field performances in the 2009–10 campaign – under the continued managership of Steve Lovell the club barely clung to their Division One status finishing 20th of 22 teams. There were league game sequences of both a 14 match win-less run (D6; L8) and a run of one win in 11 (W1; D3; L7). The first league match of the season was a near record 7–0 loss at Croydon Athletic and they nearly doubled the dose by winning 6–0 at the Homelands later in the season. The Ashford Town club did though win their final game on 4 April 2010, a 2–1 victory over Chatham.

At the end of the season there was an impasse at boardroom level and the club were in debt to Ebbsfleet United Under Football Association rules whilst this remained unpaid they were suspended from competition. In the courts the row between Betteridge and Crosbie was finally resolved with financial administration for the club and Betteridge then buying the assets of the club from the administrator. However the settlement came too late for the club to compete in the 2010–11 season.

The summer of 2010 therefore marked the end of Ashford / Ashford Town FC after a history of 80 years. During this time they had won only one League championship, the Kent league in 1948–49 and had enjoyed a few promotions and cup exploits along the way. Although relegation had usually followed shortly after the promotions the club had never for any season finished bottom of their League – albeit it was close on more than one occasion!

=== Ashford United (2011– ) ===
==== Kent Invicta League (2011–2013) ====
During what transpired to be a short one-season hiatus the club was reformed as Ashford United – a revival of the name used between 1891 and 1907. The club adopted the same crest as their immediate forerunners, Ashford Town, except the word 'United' replaced 'Town' and the simple wording 'Founded 1930' was expanded to 'Founded 1891, Reformed 2011'. The home stadium for the club remained at 'The Homelands'.

Under FA rules the 'new' Ashford United were not permitted to re-join the league where Ashford Town had left-off, so for their inaugural season of 2011–12 they were placed into 'step 6' football in the newly formed Kent Invicta League. Initially in 2011 the club appointed former manager Tony Reynolds as manager but owing to personal commitments he stepped aside before competitive games commenced and former Ashford Town player Paul Chambers took up the reins. After an indifferent start to their first season over the second half there was a ten league match unbeaten run (W5; D5) and the team finished in fifth position.

The team's finishing position improved two places in the 2012–13 season to third. 'United' were unbeaten in their first twelve league games (W10; D2), a sequence that included six straight league victories in which Mo Takalo (Takalobighashi) scored in each game. Although only the two top teams in the league were eligible for automatic promotion to the Kent League, Ashford United were awarded promotion in place of the second placed Hollands & Blair who didn't have the facilities and ground grading to take the promotion.

==== Kent League / Southern Counties East Football League (2013–2017) ====
During the close season the Kent League renamed itself as the Southern Counties East Football League. In November 2013 the control of the club changed hands when Tony Betteridge relinquished ownership (including the Homelands freehold) to a company whose directors included the wife of Don Crosbie, the director he had fought for ownership of the club in 2010. In the season's cup competitions the team reached the last 32 of the FA Vase competition (losing 1–2 at home to Hanwell Town) and in the final of the Kent Senior Trophy (played at Tonbridge) were beaten 4–0 by Beckenham Town. Between 14 September 2013 and 18 February 2014 the team achieved a then Ashford all-time record with a 10 consecutive league match winning run. United topped their division around Christmas but finished the season as distant runners-up to sole promotion candidates Whyteleafe.

The following 2014–15 season was in some ways a re-run of the previous one with a last 32 appearance in the FA Vase (losing heavily 0–5 at home to Norwich United) and a runners-up position in the league. A mid-autumn six league match win-less run (D4; L2) derailed the 'Nuts and Bolts' promotion hopes and although the team put together a new Ashford all-time record of 13 consecutive league victories they couldn't top league champions Phoenix Sports. Top scorer was Stuart Zanone with 47 goals (41 in the league) from 35 appearances who surpassed the Ashford club post-war single season goalscoring record of 46 goals in 59 appearances (established by Alan Morton playing for Ashford Town forty-two years previously). He also established an Ashford all-time record of scoring in 11 consecutive league matches (a sequence interspersed with non-scoring cup games) and equalled an Ashford all-time record of seven goals in match (equalling Joe West in the 1936–1937 season), scoring all the goals in a 7–0 victory over Lingfield. Additionally Zanone notched 28 goals in 11 consecutive away games and at the end of the season collected the league top scorer's Golden Boot award.

After the 2014–15 season in the close season the club replaced the natural grass pitch at the Homelands (which had a history of poor drainage leading to postponed fixtures) with a synthetic 3G playing surface. Delays in the installation led to early 2015–16 season match postponements and a dispute with the financiers of the project led to court proceedings in which the ownership of the Homelands ground was transferred to the finance company, followed in February by a winding-up petition being filed against the football club company. This was overturned by the court, but owing to the financial situation the league levied a ten-point deduction against the club. The disputes which continued beyond the season's end detracted from an otherwise satisfactory 2015–16 season on the pitch which began inauspiciously when on 15 August 2015, after just two games of the campaign and following a heavy 1–5 loss in the FA Cup to Cray Valley PM, the manager Paul Chambers was relieved of his duties after a stay of four years and 171 mostly won matches. Former Ashford Town defender Danny Lye – who had returned to the Homelands as a player in December 2014 – was appointed player-manager: following a mediocre first ten league matches (W4; D2; L4) over the remaining 25 league matches there were 18 victories (W18; D5; L2) and a 14 match unbeaten run incorporating 12 wins to record a third placed finish in the league table. The club progressed two rounds further than previously in the FA Vase: after a replay win away in the north-east at Gateshead based Northern League Dunston UTS (a club record 660 mile round trip) the ‘Nuts and Bolts’ reached the last eight before being eliminated 0–3 at one-time Southern League rival Salisbury. The club once again reached the final of Kent Senior Trophy where they lost 6–7 in a penalty shoot-out (after a goalless draw) to Sheppey United. The previous season's top scorer Stuart Zanone had left early in the season and was replaced by veteran forward Shaun Welford, who was brought in as player-assistant manager from Hythe Town. Welford scored in nine consecutive, all league, matches – which numerically equalled the sequences of Lee McRobert's (1999–2000) and Ted Wells (1948–1949) (although theirs were not all league games). Welford finished the campaign as United's top scorer, with 37 goals (31 in the league).

The club began the 2016–17 season with the legal dispute from the previous campaign still unresolved. Coach Danny Lye put together a strong squad – with the club asking the supporters to contribute towards the playing budget, but off-pitch problems continued: there was an administrative dispute, ultimately resolved, with the FA over registration for acceptance for promotion; then a scare over the suitability of the Homelands 3G pitch for matches. However by mid-March the dispute between the club and financiers was settled and ownership of the Homelands transferred back to the football club company and subsequently the pitch and facilities passed ground grading requirements. The team challenged all season at the top of the SCEFL Premier Division and ultimately prevailed over Crowborough Athletic to clinch the 2016–17 SCEFL Premier League title and promotion to the South Division of the Isthmian League. It was a season of records: most league wins (30 out of 38 games); most league points (92); highest Homelands league attendance to date for Ashford United (807); and in scoring 119 goals, the Ashford club record of 115 scored by Ashford Town in the Kent League of 1931–32 was eclipsed; Shaun Welford with a hat-trick in the season's last match created a new all-time club record of scoring 48 goals in 42 competitive matches (with 37 and the league Golden Boot) beating Start Zanone's 47 goal record from two seasons previously; second highest scorer Rory Hill notched 20 league goals in his total of 23 appearances; goalkeeper George Kamurasi kept 14 clean sheets in the 31 league matches in which he played. There was, after being runners-up for the previous two years, victory in the Kent Senior Trophy final with a 2–1 win over Cray Valley PM on neutral turf at Maidstone.

With the legal/stadium disputes settled and promotion achieved the close of the 2016–17 season saw Ashford United return to where their forerunners Ashford Town had been when they ceased existence seven years previously.

==== Isthmian League South / South East Division (2017– ) ====
Ashford returned to the Isthmian League South division for the 2017–18 season. Defeats in the first two games led to the club parting company with manager Danny Lye and subsequently the departure of experienced players. Youth team coach Jason Whitmore was appointed manager but poor results continued including a run of 12 league matches without a win (D2; L10). During January experienced former Greenwich Borough manager Gary Alexander was appointed as Whitmore's assistant, with a plan for him to take over as manager the following season. There was a significant turnover of players with 78 used in the 46 match league season; there were 21 goalscorers with Max Watters topping the list with 8 (from 27 appearances). The previous season had been one of positive records, this one featured negatives: 111 goals were conceded over the league campaign – the first time in excess of 100 had been conceded by either Town or United, the goal difference of negative 51 was similarly an unwanted record, the 28 league losses was the worst since the record 29 in the 1997–98 campaign, and the team's 9–1 defeat at Cray Wanderers was the worst for the new 'United' and the highest scoring/winning margin across any of the league's games that season. With ten points from their final six league matches the team scrambled to 21st-placed finish (from 24 clubs) and maintained their league status.

For the 2018–19 season there was a reorganising and resizing down to 20 teams across ‘step 4’ leagues and consequently an extra division was added at that level to the Isthmian League; United were placed in the South East Division. With Gary Alexander in position as manager the season started well with three wins; this was followed by a win-less seven league match run (D2, L5) and early exit from FA Cup and FA Trophy competitions and despite three successive league wins in November manager Alexander was sacked (via a Saturday evening text message) at the end of November. He was immediately replaced by former Ashford Town player Tommy Warrilow who had become available following the early season demise of Thamesmead Town. Under Warrilow over the remaining 23 matches of the season (W14, D3, L5) the team achieved a fourth-placed finish in the league – a promotion play-off spot. Danny Parish was top scorer over the league campaign with 25 goals from 27 starts and in a defence that conceded less than a goal a game (35 in 36 matches) there were 16 (including 6 consecutive) clean sheets kept by former England C squad goalkeeper Sam Mott. In the play-off semi-final in front of 1,123 spectators on a Monday night at Hastings United the 'Nuts and Bolts' ran-out 3–2 victors, twice coming from a goal behind and Sam Corne scoring a penalty one minute from the end of extra time for the winning goal. In the promotion final Ashford lost after extra-time 2–1 away at Horsham.

The 2019-20 and 2020–21 seasons were affected by the COVID-19 pandemic with both foreshortened and no promotion or relegation. At the suspension of the league in March 2020 with thirty of their scheduled thirty-eight fixtures completed 'United' were second in the table (albeit only fifth on a points per game basis). They were the league's highest scoring team with 75 goals of which David Smith had notched 20. Following the suspension, the season was cancelled followed by a six-month close season. The following 2020–21 season hardly happened with only six league matches completed before curtailment at the end of October 2020: the team recorded a return of three defeats from their four home league matches.

A full football program returned for the 2021–22 Isthmian League South East Division season which started in a familiar pattern for the club with early exits from the FA Cup at the preliminary round stage and at the second qualifying round from the FA Trophy. In the league, a run of 11 wins in the first 15 matches (W11; D2; L2) saw the club at the head of the table at the end of November; form dipped over the next ten league matches (W3; D2; L5) but results recovered and 8 wins from the next 11 matches saw the ‘Nuts and Bolts’ secure a second-placed finish in the table 13 points adrift of league champions Hastings United. The latter team had won 2–1 at Homelands in front of an Ashford United new record league attendance of 1,134 (and the highest seen at the Homelands for a league match since 2004-05 when 1,057 were present at the Ashford Town match versus upwardly mobile AFC Wimbledon). The subsequent promotion play-off semi-final was a 1–0 victory over Cray Valley; the final itself was an anti-climactic 0–2 loss to Herne Bay in front of a record home crowd for Ashford United of 1,865 (the 4th highest all-time competitive match Homelands attendance to date). The company accounts for the 2021–22 season showed that over the season the club had reduced its accumulated trading deficit by almost twenty-five thousand pounds, recovering the increase incurred during the previous two COVID-19 pandemic interrupted seasons.

The 2022–23 season began with seven wins by the ‘Nuts and Bolts’ from their first ten league matches (W7; D2; L1) however a thirteen match slump (W3; D3; L7) saw the team drop out of the play-off places and losses in their final four matches resulted in a ninth-placed position in the final table: at the conclusion of the campaign manager Tommy Warrilow left the club. Two weeks later Kevin Watson, who had previously enjoyed a fruitful five-year spell at Cray Valley (the 2018–19 Southern Counties East Football League champions and FA Vase finalists), was appointed as his replacemenr. The annual financial statement at May 2023 indicated that the club company's deficit had increased over the year by slightly in excess of sixty-five thousand pounds.

Owing to delays in relaying the synthetic pitch at the Homelands the club began the 2023–24 season playing their home matches at Chatham and didn't play in Ashford until early November 2023; at this time the club were in a play-off position in the league table. A slump in results from late November of four consecutive losses and then another five consecutive losses in January saw the club descend to mid-table where they would finish the season in 11th position with a negative goal difference of minus twenty-five. The club had reached the semi-finals of the Velocity Cup (Isthmian League Cup) before being beaten 4–2 by old rivals and eventual trophy winners Chatham Town; shortly thereafter in mid March manager Kevin Watson was relieved of his duties (with league match statistics of P29; W12; D3; L14). He was replaced on an interim basis by former Maidstone United F.C. joint-manager Alan Walker who was assisted by former Ashford Town player Darren Hare. The published accounts for the cub company showed it had increased its accumulated trading deficit by £42,344.

During the season, in November 2023, owner Don Crosbie had announced his intention to sell the club and in March 2024 he accepted an offer for the club with Dave Warr and former Maidstone United joint-manager Lloyd Hume taking co-ownership with Alan Walker appointed director of football.

In mid-May 2024 the cub appointed recently resigned Chatham Town assistant manager and former Gillingham captain Danny Kedwell as manager. Under him early in the season the club reached the third qualifying round of the FA Cup, before losing 3–2 at Chertsey Town, the best ever by the re-formed Ashford United and the furthest reached by any Ashford club in twenty-five attempts and also reached the FA Trophy first round proper before losing 8–7 on penalties (following a 2–2 draw) at Lewes – another best for Ashford United and the furthest for an Ashford club since 2003. In January 2024 Kedwell was replaced as manager by club joint-owner and former Maidstone United joint-manager (2006–2010) Lloyd Hume. Under both the managers the club recorded marginally more losses than wins in league matches and finished in mid-table. Club top-scorer for the season was Gary Locker with 44 goals which included 23 in league matches and 10 in FA Cup matches winning the top scorer golden boot in the competition. The published accounts for the new club company showed in its first year of trading, in which the stadium was refurbished, a loss of £242,840.

The club began the 2025–26 with Lloyd Hume continuing as manager and reached the second qualifying round of the FA Cup and the first round proper of the FA Trophy before elimination by Chatham Town and Real Bedford respectively. However with a return of only one point per match from the first nineteen league matches (W5, D4, L10) and the club just above the relegation positions Hume stepped down at the end of November 2025 in favour of his hitherto assistant Craig Stone – initially as interim manager then on a permanent basis from 23 December 2025. Over his 23 matches in charge United gained a further 48 points (W15, D3, L5) to finish ninth in the table. The leading scorer in league matches was Gary Lockyer with 23 strikes followed by Louis Collins with 20 – with no other player scoring greater than 7 goals.

== Rivalry and Supporters ==
From the earlier Ashford United days the club's rivals were chiefly Chatham, Maidstone United and Tunbridge Wells Rangers. As the club transformed first into Ashford Railway Works and then Ashford Town, the rivals became increasingly the neighbouring East Kent clubs: Folkestone, Dover, Margate and Hastings. Following Ashford's move into the Isthmian League and the eroding of the relative status of the leagues in which the 'Nuts and Bolts' have competed teams from North Kent/South London and East Sussex have mostly replaced former rivals as playing opponents and the focus of supporters rivalry.

Following the formation of Ashford United and their progression into step 9 of the football pyramid the likes of Sevenoaks Town, Greenwich Borough, Beckenham Town, Tunbridge Wells, Sheppey United and Fisher came to the fore as rivals with the latter three having supporters similarly vocal to those of the 'Nuts and Bolts'.

Since 2011, United have boasted higher attendances than around 80% of other English teams at Step 8 & 9 level. Their supporter's independent social media network is one of the largest in non-league below the National League. The vocal section renamed itself the FAMOUS NUTS AND BOLTS in 2018 and claim to be one of the largest in Kent at this level.

United fans became famous across the Football network in early 2018 when they took around 90 fans to their away game in Guernsey, a number almost triple the previous record held by Hastings United when they took 31 a year prior.

== Stadium ==
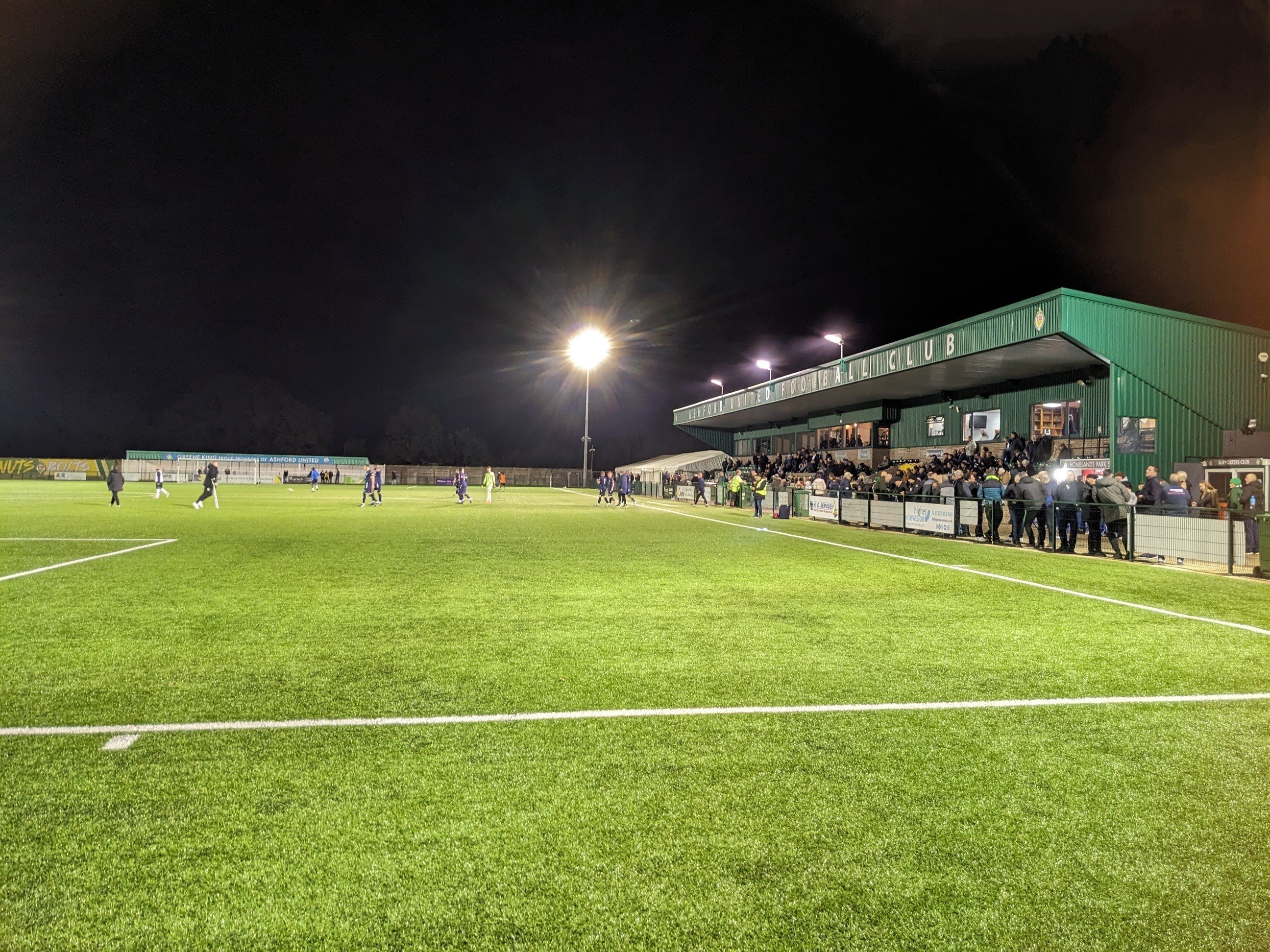
Ashford United v Beckenham Town, 2024

Green Box Stadium
- Interactive map of Green Box Stadium
- Full name: The Green Box Stadium
- Former names: Homelands
- Location: Ashford Road, Kingsnorth, Kent, TN26 1NJ
- Coordinates: 51°6′18″N 0°51′22″E
- Capacity: 3,200 (500 seated)
- Surface: Synthetic turf 3G (FIFA 2 rated)

Construction
- Built: 1989

Tenants
- Ashford Town 1989–2010; Margate 2004–05; Maidstone United 2009–2011; Ashford United 2011– Canterbury City 2014–2017; Kennington 2018–

Ashford play at the Green Box Stadium, renamed for sponsorship reasons from Homelands in November 2024. The club have played at the stadium since its construction in 1989 when they returned to the town after a two-year ground share at Folkestone, following leaving their previous home ground of 56 years at Essella Park, Ashford. The record attendance at the Homelands ground of 3,363 was set at the first round 1994–95 FA Cup match against Fulham.

The originally installed natural grass pitch at the Homelands had a history of poor drainage and wear that had over the years caused match postponements. To rectify this at the conclusion of the 2014–15 season the club began installing a new synthetic 3G pitch (of a FIFA 2 rated standard) for use the following season. Its construction was delayed and it was not available until shortly after the commencement of the 2015–16 season.

Many teams have ground-shared at the Homelands: Conference South club Margate for the 2004 season during which their Hartsdown Park stadium was being redeveloped; Maidstone United for two seasons from 2009 whilst their Gallagher Stadium ground was built; SCEFL club Canterbury City were tenants between 2014 and 2017. From the 2018–19 season Kennington who compete in the Southern Counties East Football League began to play their home matches at the Homelands.

In April 2022, a long mooted major redevelopment plan of the Homelands site was announced. This included; the installation of an additional full size 3G football pitch with changing facilities; building ten start-up business units; the erection of a new canopy for fans at the west end of the main pitch; and improvements to car parking areas – all expected to be completed for the 2023–24 season. An indoor sports hall was proposed as a future addition. (Proposed plan).

Following the take-over of the club by Dave Warr and Lloyd Hume in mid 2024 they conducted a refurbishment of the stadium and arranged the sponsorship with Green Box.

Previous Ashford Teams’ Stadiums

- South Eastern Rangers:
  Newton Green, Newtown, Ashford
- Ashford United:
  1891–1898, Victoria Ground, behind the Victoria Hotel (now Victoria Point), Ashford
  1898–1903, Godinton Road (western end, beyond railway bridge)
  1903–1907, Railway Works ground, off Newtown Road (under railway arches, Willesbough side of river Stour), Ashford
- Ashford Railway Works:
  Railway Works ground, off Newtown Road (under railway arches, Willesbough side of river Stour), Ashford
- Ashford / Ashford Town:
  1930–1931, Railway Works ground, off Newtown Road (under railway arches, Willesbough side of river Stour), Ashford
  1931–1987, Essella Park, Essella Road, Willesborough, Ashford
  1987–1989, Cheriton Road, Folkestone
  1989– , The Homelands, Kingsnorth, Ashford

== Honours ==
FIRST TEAM

- League
  - East Kent League Division 1
    - Runners-up: 1898–1899
  - East Kent League
    - Champions: (As Ashford Railway Works) 1908–09
  - Kent League: Division 2, Eastern Section
    - Champions: (As Ashford Railway Works) 1911–12, 1912–13, 1913–14, 1919–20, 1927–28
    - Runners-up: (As Ashford Railway Works) 1909–10
  - Folkestone and District Senior League
    - Champions: (As Ashford Railway Works) 1909–10
    - Runners-up: (As Ashford Railway Works) 1919–20
  - Kent League
    - Champions: 1948–49
    - Runners-up: 1931–32
  - Southern League: Southern Division
    - Runners-up: 1986–87, 1995–96
  - Southern Counties East Football League
    - Premier Division Champions: 2016–17
    - Runners-up: 2013–14, 2014–15
- Cup Competitions
  - Kent County Badge
    - Runners-up: (as South-Eastern Rangers) 1886, 1888
  - Kent Cup / Kent Senior Cup
    - Winners: 1892–93, 1958–59, 1962–63, 1992–93, 1995–96
    - Runners-up: 1888–89, 1890–91 (as South-Eastern Rangers); 1901–02, 1902–03, 1961–62, 1980–81, 1981–82
  - Kent League Cup
    - Winners: 1938–39
    - Runners-up: 1923–24 (As Ashford Railway Works); 1950–51
  - Kent Floodlight Trophy
    - Winners: 1961–62
  - Kent Senior Trophy
    - Winners: 2016–17
    - Runners-up: 2013–14, 2015–16

RESERVES

- League
  - Kent League Division 2
    - Champions: 1952–53, 1955–56
    - Runners-up: 1948–49, 1984–85, 1987–88, 1988–89, 1990–91, 2007–08
  - Seanglian League
    - Champions: 1961–62
  - Kent Amateur League: East
    - Champions: 1931–32
- Cup Competitions
  - Kent League Cup
    - Runners-up: 1971–72
  - Kent League League 2 Cup
    - Winners: 1949–50, 1952–53, 2007–08
    - Runners-up: 1986–87
  - Kent Intermediate Cup
    - Winners: 1953–54
    - Runners-up: 1952–53, 1955–56, 1957–58, 1961–62
  - Seanglian League Cup
    - Runners-up: 1960–61, 1961–62

== Club records ==
- Record attendance
  - At Essella Park: 6,525; v Crystal Palace, FA Cup first round 1959–60
  - At The Homelands: 3,363; v Fulham, FA Cup first round, 1994–95
  - At an away ground: 13,900 at Griffin Park, Brentford; v Brentford, FA Cup first round, 1959–60
- Most appearances: Peter McRobert: 819 (760 starts + 59 substitute) (1974–2002)
- Individual Goal Scoring Records
  - Most in Ashford Career: Dave Arter: 196 (1983–1986,1988–1990,1994–1996)
  - Most in a single season: (post-war): Shaun Welford: 48 (in 42 matches) 2016–17
  - Most in a single game: 7: Joe West: v Erith & Belvedere (home) Kent League 28 April 1937; Stuart Zanone: v Lingfield (away) Southern Counties East Football League 24 March 2015
  - In Consecutive League Games:
    11 Stuart Zanone (sequence excludes non-scoring cup matches) Southern Counties East Football League 2014–15.
    9 Shaun Welford (consecutively played matches) Southern Counties East Football League 2015–16;
- Single Game Records
  - Win: 15–0 v Erith & Belvedere, Kent League 28 April 1937
  - Defeats:
    (Original Ashford United) 0–12: @ Woolwich Arsenal, FA Cup 14 October 1893 & @ Sittingbourne, Thames and Medway Combination 7 November 1906
    (Ashford FC) 3–14 @ Folkestone Reserves, Kent League 1933–34
- Team Consecutive Single Season League Match Sequences
  - Wins: 13, Southern Counties East Football League 2014–15
  - Draws 6, Southern League 1961–62 (expands to 9 for all competitive matches)
  - Defeats: 7: 1932–33 Kent League; 1976–77, 1989-90 (twice) & 1997–98 Southern League
  - Unbeaten: 20 (won 16, drawn 4) Kent League 1948–49
  - Without a Win 15 (drawn 7, lost 8) Southern League 1996–97
- Highest transfer fee
  - Paid: £7,000 to Sittingbourne for J Ross and D Arter, 1994
  - Received: £20,000 from Sittingbourne for Lee McRobert, 1993
- Best Performances FA Knock-out Competitions
  - FA Cup: Second Round (3): 1960–61, 1966–67 & 1996–97
  - FA Trophy: Semi-final, 1972–73
  - FA Vase: Quarter-final 2015–16

== Ashford United Ladies ==
=== History ===
In June 2022 it was announced that the long established Ashford Ladies club was to become affiliated with the Ashford United organisation and be renamed Ashford United Ladies. The former team had moved from their long-time home, the Arthur Baker Field at Charing in 2020 and been playing for two seasons at Ashford United's home stadium of The Homelands.

Ladies football commenced in Ashford over fifty years earlier: in 1971–1972 Ashford Ladies joined the newly formed Division 1 West of the Kent Women's League. In April 1972 they were defeated in the League Cup final by Barnfield (Sevenoaks) 4–3 after extra time; the following season against the same team the result was reversed with Ashford winning the cup 1–0. Also in 1973 the team played in the quarter-finals of the Mitre sponsored Women's FA Cup. The team were League Cup runners-up on a further two occasions and were three times League runners-up before in the 1978–79 campaign they completed a feat not previously achieved by any team: they won the treble of League, League Cup and Sutcliffe Cup (retained from the previous season); top scorer Allison Wheeler scored 43 goals in the season taking her club total to 207. The same season the reserves team had a couple of near misses, finishing as runners-up in the Division 2 league and League 2 cup. As a result of their success the team were promoted to the Women's South East Regional League Premier Division (with the reserves team in Division 1).

The Ashford Ladies club now affiliated to ‘United’ had over the previous seventeen years achieved several promotions: in 2005–06 as league winners from the Kent County Division of the South East Counties Women's League to Division 1 East; from there as league runners-up into the Premier Division in 2009–10 (from which they were relegated the next season); and again as league winners into the Premier Division in 2014–2015. After maintaining mid-table finishes over the subsequent five seasons reorganisation within the women's leagues in 2020 saw the team placed in the London & South East Women's Regional League Division 1 South. In the 2021–2022 season, their final campaign as Ashford Ladies, the team finished in third position in the ten team league.

In their first season (2022–23) playing as Ashford United Ladies the team were champions of Division 1 South of the London & South East Women's Regional League and achieved promotion to the Premier Division – the fifth tier in the women's league pyramid. The team scored 113 goals over their 22 match league campaign and conceded only 23. Rebecca Wyatt with 48 goals of which 35 were in league games was the seasons top scorer (for the fifth successive season with a total of 146 goals). Additionally the team were winners over Clapton Community in a dramatic final of the L&SER Trophy (the combined Division 1 South and North knockout cup): on neutral turf at Maidstone at half-time ‘United’ were 3–0 ahead; at full-time the score was level at 3–3; with two goals in extra time the ‘United’ Ladies won 5–3 and lifted the trophy.

For season's League and Cup records of the Ashford Ladies club see List of Ashford United F.C. seasons.

=== Honours ===
- League
  - Kent League Women's League Division 1 West
    - Champions: 1978–1979
    - Runners-up: Three occasions
  - South East Counties League Kent County Division
    - Champions: 2005–06
  - South East Counties League Division 1 East
    - Champions: 2009–10
    - Runners-up: 2014–15
  - London & South East Women's Regional League Division 1 South
    - Champions: 2022–23
- Cup
  - Kent League Women's League Division 1 Cup
    - Champions: 1972–1973, 1978–1979
    - Runners-up: 1971–1972 & two other occasions
  - Sutcliffe Cup
    - Champions: 1977–1978, 1978–1979
  - London & South East Women's Regional League Trophy
    - Champions: 2022–23
