= 1992–93 FA Cup qualifying rounds =

1992-93 FA Cup qualifying rounds
Tournament details
- Country: England; Wales

The 1992–93 FA Cup qualifying rounds opened the 112th season of competition in England for 'The Football Association Challenge Cup' (FA Cup), the world's oldest association football single knockout competition. A total of 561 clubs were accepted for the competition, up three from the previous season's 558.

The large number of clubs entering the tournament from lower down (Levels 5 through 8) in the English football pyramid meant that the competition started with five rounds of preliminary (1) and qualifying (4) knockouts for these non-League teams. The 28 winning teams from fourth round qualifying progressed to the First round proper, where League teams tiered at Levels 3 and 4 entered the competition.

== Calendar ==
Round	Start date	New Entries	Clubs
Preliminary round	Saturday 29 August 1992	314	561 → 404
First round qualifying	Saturday 12 September 1992	131	404 → 260
Second round qualifying	Saturday 26 September 1992	none	260 → 188
Third round qualifying	Saturday 10 October 1992	none	188 → 152
Fourth round qualifying	Saturday 24 October 1992	20	152 → 124
First round proper	Saturday 14 November 1992	52	124 → 84
Second round proper	Saturday 5 December 1992	none	84 → 64
Third round proper	Saturday 2 January 1993	44	64 → 32
Fourth round proper	Saturday 23 January 1993	none	32 → 16
Fifth round proper	Saturday 13 February 1993	none	16 → 8
Sixth round proper	Saturday 6 March 1993	none	8 → 4
Semi-finals	Saturday 3 April 1993	none	4 → 2
Final	Saturday 15 May 1993	none	2 → 1

== Preliminary round ==
=== Ties ===
Tie	Home team	Score	Away team
1	A F C Totton	0-1	Havant Town
2	Alfreton Town	2-1	Oakham United
3	Andover	5-0	Ringmer
4	Armthorpe Welfare	2-0	Brandon United
5	Arnold Town	4-0	Liversedge
6	Ashton United	1-2	Garforth Town
7	Bamber Bridge	4-0	Prudhoe East End
8	Banstead Athletic	2-1	Eastbourne United
9	Basildon United	1-0	Tring Town
10	Beckenham Town	2-0	Feltham & Hounslow Borough
11	Bedworth United	1-0	Walsall Wood
12	Biggleswade Town	1-3	Barking
13	Bilston Town	1-3	Newcastle Town
14	Boston	4-1	Banbury United
15	Bourne Town	3-2	Peterborough City
16	Bradford Park Avenue	1-1	Burscough
17	Brook House	1-1	Aveley
18	Burnham	1-0	Canvey Island
19	Canterbury City	4-1	Bracknell Town
20	Chadderton	2-1	Lancaster City
21	Chalfont St Peter	1-0	Hoddesdon Town
22	Cheshunt	0-0	Spalding United
23	Chester-Le-Street Town	0-1	Billingham Town
24	Cinderford Town	3-0	Newbury Town
25	Clevedon Town	4-1	Yate Town
26	Clitheroe	2-1	Immingham Town
27	Congleton Town	2-0	Eastwood Town
28	Corinthian	1-0	Cove
29	Crook Town	0-3	Norton & Stockton Ancients
30	Croydon Athletic	7-3	Arundel
31	Darlington Cleveland Bridge	0-1	Consett
32	Dawlish Town	0-3	Newport A F C
33	Deal Town	3-0	Epsom & Ewell
34	Denaby United	2-5	Heanor Town
35	Dorking w/o-scr Hythe Town		
36	Easington Colliery	2-1	Shotton Comrades
37	East Thurrock United	1-0	Chipstead
38	Eastleigh	1-2	Newport I O W
39	Eccleshill United	3-2	Harworth Colliery Institute
40	Egham Town	2-1	Selsey
41	Esh Winning	0-0	Alnwick Town
42	Exmouth Town	1-2	Elmore
43	Eynesbury Rovers	4-5	Milton Keynes Borough
44	Ferryhill Athletic	2-3	Spennymoor United
45	Fisher Athletic	2-1	Brightlingsea United
46	Flackwell Heath	2-0	Walthamstow Pennant
47	Fleet Town	1-2	Abingdon Town
48	Flixton	1-1	Worksop Town
49	Forest Green Rovers	4-2	Barnstaple Town
50	Formby	1-2	Bootle
51	Gorleston	5-2	Clapton
52	Gosport Borough	0-4	Calne Town
53	Great Harwood Town	2-1	Prescot
54	Gresley Rovers	4-2	Highgate United
55	Hailsham Town	3-1	Steyning Town
56	Halesowen Harriers	2-2	Wednesfield
57	Harefield United	0-1	Barkingside
58	Haringey Borough	5-2	Bury Town
59	Harrogate Town	4-3	Louth United
60	Harwich & Parkeston	3-3	Leighton Town
61	Haywards Heath Town	0-1	Bedfont
62	Hebburn	1-1	Annfield Plain
63	Herne Bay	3-3	Camberley Town
64	Hinckley Town	1-1	Willenhall Town
65	Histon	1-2	Long Buckby
66	Hitchin Town	3-1	Chatteris Town
67	Horden Colliery Welfare	1-1	Darwen
68	Horsham Y M C A	4-3	Eastbourne Town
69	Hucknall Town	2-1	Grantham Town
70	Ilfracombe Town	3-4	Truro City
71	Ilkeston Town	7-0	Harrogate Railway Athletic
72	Irlam Town	1-2	Atherton Laburnum Rovers
73	Kingsbury Town	4-3	Oakwood
74	Lancing	2-3	Littlehampton Town
75	Leicester United	3-0	Dudley Town
76	Letchworth Garden City	1-1	Haverhill Rovers
77	Lewes	1-0	Leatherhead
78	Leyton	5-4	Felixstowe Town
79	Lye Town	1-1	Barwell
80	March Town United	1-3	Braintree Town
81	Melksham Town	1-5	Swanage Town & Herston
82	Merstham	0-0	Malden Vale
83	Metropolitan Police	0-0	Ford United
84	Mickleover R B L	0-2	Belper Town
85	Minehead	2-2	A F C Lymington
86	Molesey	3-1	Northwood
87	Nantwich Town	1-1	Maltby Miners Welfare
88	Newcastle Blue Star	0-0	Whickham
89	Newmarket Town	4-0	Langford
90	Northallerton Town	6-1	Langley Park
91	Northampton Spencer	1-1	Rushall Olympic
92	Norwich United	1-0	Edgware Town
93	Nuneaton Borough	2-1	Boldmere St Michaels
94	Ossett Town	1-2	Dunston Federation Brewery
95	Oxford City	2-3	Devizes Town
96	Paulton Rovers	0-2	Bristol Manor Farm
97	Pelsall Villa	0-0	Oldbury United
98	Peterlee Newtown	1-0	Evenwood Town
99	Petersfield United	0-1	Chippenham Town
100	Poole Town	0-1	Abingdon United
101	Portfield	2-4	Faversham Town
102	Purfleet	4-1	Great Yarmouth Town
103	Rainham Town	2-0	Mirrlees Blackstone
104	Raunds Town	2-2	Rocester
105	Rayners Lane	2-2	Ashford Town (Middx)
106	Redhill	1-5	Boreham Wood
107	Royston Town	1-2	Potton United
108	Ruislip Manor	1-0	Hornchurch
109	Rushden & Diamonds	2-0	Desborough Town
110	Ryde Sports	1-2	Southwick
111	Salford City	0-1	North Ferriby United
112	Sandwell Borough	4-0	Malvern Town
113	Sheffield	2-2	Rossendale United
114	Sheppey United	0-1	Croydon
115	Shildon	2-0	Blackpool Rovers
116	Sholing Sports	1-2	Bemerton Heath Harlequins
117	Shoreham	0-3	Witney Town
118	Shortwood United	0-4	Brockenhurst
119	South Bank	5-0	Bedlington Terriers
120	St Blazey	1-4	Falmouth Town
121	St Helens Town	3-2	Tow Law Town
122	Stewart & Lloyds Corby	4-2	Evesham United
123	Stourport Swifts	0-5	Stourbridge
124	Stratford Town	6-2	Hinckley Athletic
125	Sudbury Town	6-1	Saffron Walden Town
126	Sutton Coldfield Town	0-0	West Bromwich Town
127	Taunton Town	0-3	Barri
128	Thackley	2-1	Radcliffe Borough
129	Three Bridges	0-3	Alma Swanley
130	Tilbury	3-2	Collier Row
131	Torrington	1-0	Bideford
132	Tunbridge Wells	0-4	Margate
133	Uxbridge	4-2	Southall
134	Viking Sports	0-1	Bishop's Stortford
135	Waltham Abbey	1-1	Halstead Town
136	Walton & Hersham	2-1	Peacehaven & Telscombe
137	Ware	1-2	Stowmarket Town
138	Warrington Town	6-1	Skelmersdale United
139	Washington	1-3	Stockton
140	Watton United	1-0	Burnham Ramblers
141	Wealdstone	2-1	Tiptree United
142	Welton Rovers	4-1	Hungerford Town
143	Wembley	5-0	Welwyn Garden City
144	West Midlands Police	5-2	Bridgnorth Town
145	Westbury United	0-5	Thatcham Town
146	Whitehawk	5-2	Chichester City (Ordered to be replayed, extra time played in error)
147	Whitstable Town	1-2	Sittingbourne
148	Whyteleafe	5-1	Pagham
149	Wick	1-1	Ashford Town (Kent)
150	Willington	1-5	Whitby Town
151	Wimborne Town	1-1	Bournemouth
152	Wisbech Town	10-0	Wellingborough Town
153	Witham Town	4-3	Wingate & Finchley
154	Workington	3-2	West Auckland Town
155	Worthing	8-0	Chatham Town
156	Worthing United	1-4	Langney Sports
157	Yorkshire Amateur	1-3	Seaham Red Star

=== Replays ===
Tie	Home team	Score	Away team
16	Burscough	1-2	Bradford Park Avenue
17	Aveley	1-0	Brook House
22	Spalding United	0-5	Cheshunt
41	Alnwick Town	2-1	Esh Winning
48	Worksop Town	3-0	Flixton
56	Wednesfield	2-3	Halesowen Harriers
60	Leighton Town	2-0	Harwich & Parkeston
62	Annfield Plain	5-1	Hebburn
63	Camberley Town	2-3	Herne Bay
64	Willenhall Town	2-1	Hinckley Town
67	Darwen	5-0	Horden Colliery Welfare
76	Haverhill Rovers	3-4	Letchworth Garden City
79	Barwell	1-3	Lye Town
82	Malden Vale	3-1	Merstham
83	Ford United	0-2	Metropolitan Police
85	A F C Lymington	2-1	Minehead
87	Maltby Miners Welfare	2-3	Nantwich Town
88	Whickham	0-2	Newcastle Blue Star
91	Rushall Olympic	3-2	Northampton Spencer
97	Oldbury United	4-4	Pelsall Villa
104	Rocester	3-4	Raunds Town
105	Ashford Town (Middx)	0-1	Rayners Lane
113	Rossendale United	1-2	Sheffield
126	West Bromwich Town	0-2	Sutton Coldfield Town
135	Halstead Town	3-4	Waltham Abbey
149	Chichester City	1-3	Whitehawk
151	Ashford Town (Kent)	3-1	Wick
156	Bournemouth	1-3	Wimborne Town

=== 2nd replay ===
Tie	Home team	Score	Away team
97	Pelsall Villa	1-0	Oldbury United

== 1st qualifying round ==
=== Ties ===
Tie	Home team	Score	Away team
1	A F C Lymington	3-3	Bristol Manor Farm
2	Abingdon Town	4-0	Devizes Town
3	Abingdon United	0-5	Bemerton Heath Harlequins
4	Alfreton Town	0-0	Stafford Rangers
5	Alma Swanley	1-0	Bedfont
6	Alnwick Town	0-0	Consett
7	Altrincham	3-0	Curzon Ashton
8	Andover	0-6	Hampton
9	Annfield Plain	0-1	Newcastle Blue Star
10	Arlesey Town	0-1	Shepshed Albion
11	Armthorpe Welfare	2-2	Billingham Town
12	Ashford Town (Kent)	1-1	Faversham Town
13	Atherton Laburnum Rovers	1-1	Great Harwood Town
14	Bamber Bridge	1-1	Peterlee Newtown
15	Banstead Athletic	4-1	Herne Bay
16	Barkingside	1-3	Wembley
17	Barri	1-3	Clevedon Town
18	Barton Rovers	2-3	Moor Green
19	Blakenall	4-3	Droylsden
20	Bognor Regis Town	9-2	Romsey Town
21	Boreham Wood	2-2	Chesham United
22	Boston	3-4	Stourbridge
23	Boston United	2-1	King's Lynn
24	Bourne Town	3-2	Milton Keynes Borough
25	Bradford Park Avenue	2-0	Belper Town
26	Brigg Town	2-1	Bridlington Town
27	Brockenhurst	1-0	Basingstoke Town
28	Buckingham Town	1-1	Maidenhead United
29	Burgess Hill Town	0-2	Hastings Town
30	Burnham	3-2	Bishop's Stortford
31	Caernarfon Town	1-4	Colwyn Bay
32	Carshalton Athletic	1-2	Erith & Belvedere
33	Chadderton	3-0	Bootle
34	Chasetown	1-0	Redditch United
35	Chelmsford City	0-0	Grays Athletic
36	Chertsey Town	3-2	Gravesend & Northfleet
37	Cheshunt	1-0	Chalfont St Peter
38	Chippenham Town	1-2	Thatcham Town
39	Chorley	1-1	Knowsley United
40	Clitheroe	1-3	Hucknall Town
41	Congleton Town	0-0	Nantwich Town
42	Corinthian Casuals	1-1	Slough Town
43	Croydon	0-0	Canterbury City
44	Croydon Athletic	1-2	Dorking
45	Dagenham & Redbridge	1-1	Billericay Town
46	Dartford scr-w/o Horsham		
47	Darwen	1-6	Northallerton Town
48	Deal Town	4-0	Malden Vale
49	Dunston Federation Brewery	7-0	Norton & Stockton Ancients
50	Durham City	1-1	Bishop Auckland
51	Easington Colliery	1-1	Workington
52	Egham Town	1-1	Worthing
53	Falmouth Town	2-0	Elmore
54	Fareham Town	2-0	Tooting & Mitcham United
55	Fisher Athletic	1-7	Stevenage Borough
56	Flackwell Heath	0-5	Stowmarket Town
57	Fleetwood Town	3-2	Guiseley
58	Forest Green Rovers	1-2	Newport A F C
59	Frickley Athletic	0-0	Lincoln United
60	Frome Town	1-2	Worcester City
61	Gateshead	3-1	Billingham Synthonia
62	Glastonbury	0-4	Bath City
63	Glossop North End	0-1	Macclesfield Town
64	Gloucester City	2-3	Weston Super Mare
65	Goole Town	0-1	Horwich R M I
66	Hailsham Town	2-3	Bromley
67	Halesowen Harriers	2-1	Lye Town
68	Haringey Borough	0-0	Gorleston
69	Harrogate Town	1-2	Warrington Town
70	Harrow Borough	0-2	Berkhamsted Town
71	Havant Town	2-1	Horsham Y M C A
72	Heanor Town	2-1	Ilkeston Town
73	Hednesford Town	1-1	Tamworth
74	Hemel Hempstead	1-2	Solihull Borough
75	Hertford Town	0-2	Hendon
76	Heybridge Swifts	2-4	Cambridge City
77	Hitchin Town	4-2	Wisbech Town
78	Hyde United	1-5	Accrington Stanley
79	Kempston Rovers	3-4	Wivenhoe Town
80	Kingsbury Town	2-3	Beckenham Town
81	Kingstonian	4-0	Dulwich Hamlet
82	Langney Sports	3-1	Littlehampton Town
83	Leek Town	3-2	Burton Albion
84	Leighton Town	2-4	Aveley
85	Letchworth Garden City	0-4	Braintree Town
86	Leyton	4-2	Lowestoft Town
87	Long Buckby	0-1	Rushden & Diamonds
88	Maine Road	2-1	Morecambe
89	Mangotsfield United	0-1	Dorchester Town
90	Margate	0-0	Corinthian
91	Marine	5-0	Emley
92	Metropolitan Police	2-1	Lewes
93	Molesey	4-2	East Thurrock United
94	Mossley	0-0	Borrowash Victoria
95	Murton	1-2	Guisborough Town
96	Newcastle Town	0-1	Gresley Rovers
97	Newport I O W	2-3	Wimborne Town
98	North Ferriby United	1-0	Garforth Town
99	Northwich Victoria	4-1	Winsford United
100	Norwich United	2-1	Barking
101	Nuneaton Borough	3-1	Leicester United
102	Ossett Albion	1-3	Netherfield
103	Paget Rangers	1-3	Gainsborough Trinity
104	Pelsall Villa	1-0	Willenhall Town
105	Penrith	1-2	Blyth Spartans
106	Purfleet	6-1	Watton United
107	Racing Club Warwick	0-2	Eastwood Hanley
108	Rainham Town	0-1	Corby Town
109	Raunds Town	0-0	Stratford Town
110	Rayners Lane	1-1	Uxbridge
111	Rothwell Town	0-2	Matlock Town
112	Ruislip Manor	3-1	Basildon United
113	Rushall Olympic	3-0	Sandwell Borough
114	Salisbury	6-2	Trowbridge Town
115	Seaham Red Star	3-2	Eccleshill United
116	Sheffield	3-1	Thackley
117	Shildon	0-2	Whitby Town
118	Slade Green w/o-scr Harlow Town		
119	South Bank w/o-scr North Shields		
120	Southport	0-0	Buxton
121	Southwick	2-5	Witney Town
122	Spennymoor United	4-0	Gretna
123	St Albans City	3-1	Brimsdown Rovers
124	St Helens Town	3-4	Stockton
125	Staines Town	0-3	Yeading
126	Stewart & Lloyds Corby	1-3	Sutton Coldfield Town
127	Stocksbridge Park Steels	0-4	Stalybridge Celtic
128	Sudbury Town	3-2	Potton United
129	Swanage Town & Herston	1-2	Cinderford Town
130	Thame United	2-3	Bashley
131	Tilbury	1-1	Newmarket Town
132	Tonbridge	0-0	Dover Athletic
133	Truro City	2-0	Torrington
134	V S Rugby w/o-scr Alvechurch		
135	Waltham Abbey	2-3	Baldock Town
136	Walton & Hersham	2-0	Wokingham Town
137	Waterlooville	0-0	Cheltenham Town
138	Wealdstone	2-1	Witham Town
139	Welton Rovers	1-4	Calne Town
140	West Midlands Police	1-2	Bedworth United
141	Weymouth	1-0	Saltash United
142	Whitehawk	0-1	Sittingbourne
143	Whyteleafe	1-3	Windsor & Eton
144	Worksop Town	5-3	Arnold Town

=== Replays ===
Tie	Home team	Score	Away team
1	Bristol Manor Farm	0-2	A F C Lymington
4	Stafford Rangers	3-0	Alfreton Town
6	Consett	2-0	Alnwick Town
11	Billingham Town	2-0	Armthorpe Welfare
12	Faversham Town	0-2	Ashford Town (Kent)
13	Great Harwood Town	1-2	Atherton Laburnum Rovers
14	Peterlee Newtown	0-2	Bamber Bridge
21	Chesham United	9-1	Boreham Wood
28	Maidenhead United	2-1	Buckingham Town
35	Grays Athletic	2-1	Chelmsford City
39	Knowsley United	2-1	Chorley
41	Nantwich Town	2-1	Congleton Town
42	Slough Town	4-3	Corinthian Casuals
43	Canterbury City	2-1	Croydon
45	Billericay Town	1-4	Dagenham & Redbridge
50	Bishop Auckland	5-2	Durham City
51	Workington	1-0	Easington Colliery
52	Worthing	7-1	Egham Town
59	Lincoln United	0-1	Frickley Athletic
68	Gorleston	1-0	Haringey Borough
73	Tamworth	2-4	Hednesford Town
90	Corinthian	1-1	Margate
94	Borrowash Victoria	0-1	Mossley
109	Stratford Town	1-2	Raunds Town
110	Uxbridge	0-1	Rayners Lane
120	Buxton	1-2	Southport
131	Newmarket Town	1-0	Tilbury
132	Dover Athletic	2-1	Tonbridge
137	Cheltenham Town	2-0	Waterlooville

=== 2nd replay ===
Tie	Home team	Score	Away team
90	Margate	4-0	Corinthian

== 2nd qualifying round ==
=== Ties ===
Tie	Home team	Score	Away team
1	A F C Lymington	1-1	Dorchester Town
2	Abingdon Town	2-0	Maidenhead United
3	Accrington Stanley	2-0	Bradford Park Avenue
4	Altrincham	3-1	Sheffield
5	Ashford Town (Kent)	2-2	Windsor & Eton
6	Atherton Laburnum Rovers	1-2	Colwyn Bay
7	Bamber Bridge	0-4	Spennymoor United
8	Bashley	3-1	Wimborne Town
9	Bedworth United	1-1	Stafford Rangers
10	Berkhamsted Town	0-0	Beckenham Town
11	Blyth Spartans	6-0	Workington
12	Bognor Regis Town	1-1	Bemerton Heath Harlequins
13	Boston United	1-2	Aveley
14	Bourne Town	4-8	Moor Green
15	Calne Town	0-1	Brockenhurst
16	Cambridge City	6-1	Norwich United
17	Chasetown	0-2	Braintree Town
18	Cheltenham Town	3-0	Cinderford Town
19	Cheshunt	0-0	Solihull Borough
20	Consett	3-4	Netherfield
21	Dagenham & Redbridge	6-1	Stowmarket Town
22	Dorking	4-2	Walton & Hersham
23	Dover Athletic	0-0	Banstead Athletic
24	Dunston Federation Brewery	2-0	South Bank
25	Erith & Belvedere	1-1	Havant Town
26	Falmouth Town	0-3	Bath City
27	Fleetwood Town	1-2	Northallerton Town
28	Frickley Athletic	8-2	Halesowen Harriers
29	Gateshead	5-2	Whitby Town
30	Gorleston	1-2	Leyton
31	Grays Athletic	1-0	Sudbury Town
32	Gresley Rovers	1-4	Gainsborough Trinity
33	Guisborough Town	3-0	Billingham Town
34	Hastings Town	1-2	Canterbury City
35	Hednesford Town	4-1	Rushden & Diamonds
36	Hendon	6-0	Burnham
37	Horsham	1-6	Deal Town
38	Horwich R M I	1-1	Worksop Town
39	Hucknall Town	1-1	Macclesfield Town
40	Kingstonian	2-2	Langney Sports
41	Knowsley United	0-2	Stockton
42	Leek Town	0-1	Rushall Olympic
43	Margate	1-4	Chertsey Town
44	Marine	2-0	Heanor Town
45	Metropolitan Police	0-1	Slough Town
46	Molesey	0-4	Chesham United
47	Mossley	1-2	Pelsall Villa
48	Nantwich Town	1-0	Blakenall
49	Newcastle Blue Star	0-1	Bishop Auckland
50	Newmarket Town	2-2	Baldock Town
51	Newport A F C	3-0	Worcester City
52	North Ferriby United	0-2	Brigg Town
53	Northwich Victoria	0-2	Raunds Town
54	Nuneaton Borough	2-1	Matlock Town
55	Purfleet	2-2	Corby Town
56	Ruislip Manor	1-3	Stevenage Borough
57	Salisbury	4-0	Thatcham Town
58	Seaham Red Star	1-1	Maine Road
59	Sittingbourne	3-2	Fareham Town
60	Southport	2-0	Chadderton
61	St Albans City	5-1	Rayners Lane
62	Stourbridge	0-0	Shepshed Albion
63	Sutton Coldfield Town	2-1	Eastwood Hanley
64	V S Rugby	3-0	Hitchin Town
65	Warrington Town	0-3	Stalybridge Celtic
66	Wealdstone	1-1	Wivenhoe Town
67	Wembley	3-2	Slade Green
68	Weston Super Mare	0-4	Clevedon Town
69	Weymouth	3-2	Truro City
70	Witney Town	3-1	Hampton
71	Worthing	2-1	Bromley
72	Yeading	7-1	Alma Swanley

=== Replays ===
Tie	Home team	Score	Away team
1	Dorchester Town	2-4	A F C Lymington
5	Windsor & Eton	2-3	Ashford Town (Kent)
9	Stafford Rangers	1-0	Bedworth United
10	Beckenham Town	0-1	Berkhamsted Town
12	Bemerton Heath Harlequins	2-2	Bognor Regis Town
19	Solihull Borough	4-0	Cheshunt
23	Banstead Athletic	1-2	Dover Athletic
25	Havant Town	5-4	Erith & Belvedere
38	Worksop Town	1-5	Horwich R M I
39	Macclesfield Town	3-1	Hucknall Town
40	Langney Sports	1-1	Kingstonian
50	Baldock Town	2-6	Newmarket Town
55	Corby Town	1-0	Purfleet
58	Maine Road	1-1	Seaham Red Star
62	Shepshed Albion	4-2	Stourbridge
66	Wivenhoe Town	0-2	Wealdstone

=== 2nd replays ===
Tie	Home team	Score	Away team
12	Bognor Regis Town	1-1	Bemerton Heath Harlequins
40	Kingstonian	3-1	Langney Sports
58	Maine Road	0-5	Seaham Red Star

=== 3rd replay ===
Tie	Home team	Score	Away team
12	Bemerton Heath Harlequins	1-0	Bognor Regis Town

== 3rd qualifying round ==
=== Ties ===
Tie	Home team	Score	Away team
1	A F C Lymington	0-1	Cheltenham Town
2	Abingdon Town	4-2	Bashley
3	Ashford Town (Kent)	3-1	Deal Town
4	Bath City	2-0	Weymouth
5	Bishop Auckland	1-3	Blyth Spartans
6	Brigg Town	0-1	Southport
7	Brockenhurst	1-3	Salisbury
8	Chertsey Town	1-3	Kingstonian
9	Chesham United	3-0	Berkhamsted Town
10	Colwyn Bay	3-3	Altrincham
11	Corby Town	4-1	Aveley
12	Dorking	1-0	Dover Athletic
13	Dunston Federation Brewery	0-3	Northallerton Town
14	Gainsborough Trinity	4-2	Pelsall Villa
15	Leyton	3-0	Cambridge City
16	Macclesfield Town	1-0	Horwich R M I
17	Moor Green	1-2	V S Rugby
18	Nantwich Town	0-1	Marine
19	Netherfield	4-1	Guisborough Town
20	Newmarket Town	1-0	Grays Athletic
21	Newport A F C	1-1	Clevedon Town
22	Nuneaton Borough	4-0	Raunds Town
23	Seaham Red Star	1-2	Stockton
24	Shepshed Albion	1-2	Hednesford Town
25	Sittingbourne	3-2	Havant Town
26	Slough Town	2-1	Yeading
27	Solihull Borough	4-1	Braintree Town
28	Spennymoor United	0-7	Gateshead
29	Stafford Rangers	3-0	Frickley Athletic
30	Stalybridge Celtic	1-2	Accrington Stanley
31	Stevenage Borough	3-3	St Albans City
32	Sutton Coldfield Town	0-0	Rushall Olympic
33	Wealdstone	1-6	Dagenham & Redbridge
34	Wembley	1-0	Hendon
35	Witney Town	1-0	Bemerton Heath Harlequins
36	Worthing	3-1	Canterbury City

=== Replays ===
Tie	Home team	Score	Away team
10	Altrincham	1-1	Colwyn Bay
21	Clevedon Town	1-1	Newport A F C
31	St Albans City	2-1	Stevenage Borough
32	Rushall Olympic	1-1	Sutton Coldfield Town

=== 2nd replays ===
Tie	Home team	Score	Away team
10	Altrincham	3-1	Colwyn Bay
21	Newport A F C	4-2	Clevedon Town
32	Rushall Olympic	1-2	Sutton Coldfield Town

== 4th qualifying round ==
The teams that given byes to this round are Kettering Town, Merthyr Tydfil, Farnborough Town, Telford United, Welling United, Yeovil Town, Runcorn, Kidderminster Harriers, Bromsgrove Rovers, Barrow, Sutton United, Aylesbury United, Halesowen Town, Hayes, Whitley Bay, Atherstone United, Crawley Town, Enfield, Marlow and Tiverton Town.

=== Ties ===
Tie	Home team	Score	Away team
1	Abingdon Town	0-0	Merthyr Tydfil
2	Accrington Stanley	3-1	Northallerton Town
3	Ashford Town (Kent)	1-2	Slough Town
4	Barrow	0-0	Southport
5	Blyth Spartans	1-1	Stockton
6	Cheltenham Town	3-2	Worthing
7	Crawley Town	1-2	Yeovil Town
8	Enfield	0-0	Aylesbury United
9	Farnborough Town	1-1	Dorking
10	Gainsborough Trinity	0-2	Altrincham
11	Gateshead	3-0	Whitley Bay
12	Halesowen Town	1-2	V S Rugby
13	Hednesford Town	1-3	Dagenham & Redbridge
14	Kettering Town	2-1	Corby Town
15	Kidderminster Harriers	2-0	Atherstone United
16	Kingstonian	2-1	Welling United
17	Netherfield	1-1	Macclesfield Town
18	Newmarket Town	0-2	Hayes
19	Newport A F C	1-4	Sutton United
20	Runcorn	1-4	Marine
21	Sittingbourne	1-1	Marlow
22	Solihull Borough	3-1	Chesham United
23	Stafford Rangers	3-0	Bromsgrove Rovers
24	Sutton Coldfield Town	6-1	Leyton
25	Telford United	1-2	St Albans City
26	Tiverton Town	0-0	Bath City
27	Wembley	1-1	Nuneaton Borough
28	Witney Town	1-2	Salisbury

=== Replays ===
Tie	Home team	Score	Away team
1	Merthyr Tydfil	2-1	Abingdon Town
4	Southport	3-2	Barrow
5	Stockton	1-2	Blyth Spartans
8	Aylesbury United	2-1	Enfield
9	Dorking	2-0	Farnborough Town
17	Macclesfield Town	5-0	Netherfield
21	Marlow	2-1	Sittingbourne
26	Bath City	2-1	Tiverton Town
27	Nuneaton Borough	0-0	Wembley

=== 2nd replay ===
Tie	Home team	Score	Away team
27	Wembley	1-2	Nuneaton Borough

== 1992-93 FA Cup ==
See 1992-93 FA Cup for details of the rounds from the first round proper onwards.
