= 1990–91 FA Cup qualifying rounds =

Tournament details
- Country: England; Wales

The 1990–91 FA Cup qualifying rounds opened the 110th season of competition in England for 'The Football Association Challenge Cup' (FA Cup), the world's oldest association football single knockout competition. A total of 563 clubs were accepted for the competition, up 23 from the previous season's 540.

The large number of clubs entering the tournament from lower down (Levels 5 through 8) in the English football pyramid meant that the competition started with five rounds of preliminary (1) and qualifying (4) knockouts for these non-League teams. The 28 winning teams from fourth round qualifying progressed to the First round proper, where League teams tiered at Levels 3 and 4 entered the competition.

== Calendar ==
Round	Start date	New Entries	Clubs
Preliminary round	Saturday 1 September 1990	318	563 → 404
First round qualifying	Saturday 15 September 1990	129	404 → 260
Second round qualifying	Saturday 29 September 1990	none	260 → 188
Third round qualifying	Saturday 13 October 1990	none	188 → 152
Fourth round qualifying	Saturday 27 October 1990	20	152 → 124
First round proper	Saturday 17 November 1990	52	124 → 84
Second round proper	Friday 7 December 1990	none	84 → 64
Third round proper	Saturday 5 January 1991	44	64 → 32
Fourth round proper	Saturday 26 January 1991	none	32 → 16
Fifth round proper	Saturday 16 February 1991	none	16 → 8
Sixth round proper	Saturday 9 March 1991	none	8 → 4
Semi-finals	Sunday 14 April 1991	none	4 → 2
Final	Saturday 18 May 1991	none	2 → 1

== Preliminary round ==
=== Ties ===
Tie	Home team	Score	Away team
1	A F C Totton	2-3	Warminster Town
2	Alfreton Town	2-2	Rushall Olympic
3	Alma Swanley	1-2	Purfleet
4	Alvechurch	2-1	Desborough Town
5	Arlesey Town	0-4	Walthamstow Pennant
6	Armthorpe Welfare	3-0	Sheffield
7	Arnold Town	1-1	Wednesfield
8	Arundel	2-3	Chatham Town
9	Ashford Town (Kent)	3-1	Leatherhead
10	Ashington	1-4	Prudhoe East End
11	Ashton United	0-2	Denaby United
12	Atherton Laburnum Rovers	2-0	Rossendale United
13	Baker Perkins	5-2	Letchworth Garden City
14	Banstead Athletic	1-0	Malden Vale
15	Barkingside	2-1	Aveley
16	Barry Town	2-1	Minehead
17	Bedlington Terriers	0-4	Norton & Stockton Ancients
18	Belper Town	2-3	St Helens Town
19	Billericay Town	4-0	Hanwell Town
20	Billingham Town	1-0	Brandon United
21	Blackpool Wren Rovers	2-4	Accrington Stanley
22	Bootle	1-0	Winsford United
23	Boreham Wood	2-0	Gorleston
24	Borrowash Victoria	1-2	Gresley Rovers
25	Boston	2-0	King's Lynn
26	Bourne Town	3-0	Ely City
27	Bournemouth	1-0	Thatcham Town
28	Brackley Town	1-0	Walsall Wood
29	Bracknell Town	2-3	Hampton
30	Braintree Town	1-0	Collier Row
31	Bridgend Town	2-1	Ton Pentre
32	Bridgnorth Town	1-1	Vauxhall G M
33	Burnham Ramblers	0-2	Hornchurch
34	Burscough	0-3	Maine Road
35	Calne Town	2-0	Paulton Rovers
36	Camberley Town	0-5	Oakwood
37	Canterbury City	0-0	Dorking
38	Chadderton	1-2	Radcliffe Borough
39	Chasetown	0-2	Evesham United
40	Chertsey Town	0-3	Walton & Hersham
41	Chesham United	4-1	Baldock Town
42	Chester-Le-Street Town	0-2	Easington Colliery
43	Chichester City	1-5	A F C Lymington
44	Chipstead	2-3	Littlehampton Town
45	Clacton Town	0-1	Hertford Town
46	Clapton	5-2	Felixstowe Town
47	Clevedon Town	3-3	Dawlish Town
48	Cove	4-0	Haywards Heath Town
49	Cray Wanderers	3-1	Waltham Abbey
50	Crook Town	1-2	Horden Colliery Welfare
51	Croydon	0-4	Egham Town
52	Croydon Athletic	2-2	Andover
53	Cwmbran Town	0-4	Mangotsfield United
54	Darlington Cleveland Bridge	0-1	Evenwood Town
55	Darwen	2-0	Peterlee Newtown
56	Dudley Town	1-1	Corby Town
57	East Thurrock United	0-1	Stevenage Borough
58	Eastbourne United	6-5	Tunbridge Wells
59	Eastwood Hanley	0-2	West Midlands Police
60	Eton Manor	0-2	Edgware Town
61	Farsley Celtic	1-1	Ossett Albion
62	Feltham	2-0	Thame United
63	Ferryhill Athletic	3-1	Blackpool Mechanics
64	Flackwell Heath	5-0	Tring Town
65	Ford United	3-1	Kingsbury Town
66	Glossop	1-1	Skelmersdale United
67	Great Harwood Town	2-2	Harrogate Town
68	Great Yarmouth Town	2-2	Langford
69	Halstead Town	1-1	Canvey Island
70	Harefield United	0-1	Merstham
71	Harwich & Parkeston	4-1	Berkhamsted Town
72	Havant Town	3-0	Horndean
73	Haverhill Rovers	1-1	Eynesbury Rovers
74	Heanor Town	0-4	Halesowen Harriers
75	Hebburn	0-2	Ryhope Community Association
76	Hednesford Town	2-0	Guiseley
77	Hemel Hempstead	1-2	Metropolitan Police
78	Hinckley Athletic	3-1	Friar Lane Old Boys
79	Holbeach United	1-2	Potton United
80	Horsham	2-0	Epsom & Ewell
81	Horsham Y M C A	3-2	Darenth Heathside
82	Hungerford Town	1-0	Fareham Town
83	Ilfracombe Town	4-0	Barnstaple Town
84	Irlam Town	2-0	Formby
85	Irthlingborough Diamonds	3-4	Buckingham Town
86	Knowsley United	1-1	Ossett Town
87	Lancaster City	2-0	Thackley
88	Lancing	0-3	Lewes
89	Langley Park Welfare	2-0	Washington
90	Langney Sports	3-0	Portfield
91	Leighton Town	0-1	Spalding United
92	Louth United	1-1	Princes End United
93	Lowestoft Town	1-0	Mirrlees Blackstone
94	Maesteg Park w/o-scr Sharpness		
95	Malvern Town	3-0	Soham Town Rangers
96	Melksham Town	2-1	Keynsham Town
97	Mile Oak Rovers	0-5	Stourbridge
98	Molesey	1-1	Vauxhall Motors
99	Netherfield	0-3	Murton
100	Newbury Town	2-1	Eastleigh
101	Newmarket Town	2-1	Cheshunt
102	Newtown	1-1	Eastwood Town
103	North Ferriby United	1-2	Leicester United
104	North Shields	2-0	Whickham
105	Northallerton Town	4-2	Clitheroe
106	Nuneaton Borough	4-1	Hinckley Town
107	Oakham United	1-1	Long Eaton United
108	Oldbury United	0-0	Wolverton
109	Paget Rangers	2-0	Boldmere St Michaels
110	Peacehaven & Telscombe	8-1	Selsey
111	Penrith	0-5	Harrogate Railway Athletic
112	Prescot	1-1	Emley
113	Radstock Town	0-3	Weston Super Mare
114	Ramsgate	0-1	Margate
115	Rayners Lane	2-1	Hoddesdon Town
116	Romsey Town	1-0	Frome Town
117	Rothwell Town	7-2	Stamford
118	Royston Town	1-1	Rainham Town
119	Ruislip Manor	2-1	Northwood
120	Salford City	0-3	Warrington Town
121	Salisbury	1-1	Uxbridge
122	Saltash United	1-1	Torrington
123	Sandwell Borough	4-1	Northampton Spencer
124	Sheppey United	0-2	Pagham
125	Shildon	3-1	Garforth Town
126	Sholing Sports	1-3	Abingdon United
127	Shortwood United	1-2	St Blazey
128	Shotton Comrades	1-2	Esh Winning
129	Sittingbourne	2-0	Burgess Hill Town
130	Slade Green	2-0	Ringmer
131	Solihull Borough	0-0	Banbury United
132	Southwick	1-0	Corinthian
133	St Austell	0-4	Falmouth Town
134	Steyning Town	1-2	Whitehawk
135	Stowmarket Town	1-1	Saffron Walden Town
136	Stratford Town	3-1	Highgate United
137	Sutton Town	2-2	Rocester
138	Swanage Town & Herston	4-0	Devizes Town
139	Three Bridges	1-3	Wick
140	Tilbury	0-0	Southall
141	Tiptree United	0-1	Harlow Town
142	Tiverton Town	4-1	Welton Rovers
143	Tonbridge	2-1	Shoreham
144	Tooting & Mitcham United	1-1	Hastings Town
145	Trowbridge Town	7-1	Clandown
146	Ware	0-0	Corinthian Casuals
147	Wellingborough Town	1-0	Tividale
148	Welwyn Garden City	1-2	Chalfont St Peter
149	Wembley	1-0	Bury Town
150	West Auckland Town	4-2	Annfield Plain
151	Westbury United	1-1	Stroud
152	Whitby Town	2-0	Leyland Daf-Sgl
153	Willenhall Town	1-1	Brigg Town
154	Willington	0-1	Cleator Moor Celtic
155	Wimborne Town	3-2	Bideford
156	Wisbech Town	1-1	Barton Rovers
157	Witham Town	2-3	Basildon United
158	Wootton Blue Cross	1-3	Hounslow
159	Yate Town	4-0	Glastonbury

=== Replays ===
Tie	Home team	Score	Away team
2	Rushall Olympic	3-0	Alfreton Town
7	Wednesfield	1-0	Arnold Town
32	Vauxhall G M	4-1	Bridgnorth Town
37	Dorking	4-1	Canterbury City
47	Dawlish Town	2-3	Clevedon Town
52	Andover	7-1	Croydon Athletic
56	Corby Town	1-0	Dudley Town
61	Ossett Albion	0-2	Farsley Celtic
66	Skelmersdale United	0-2	Glossop
67	Harrogate Town	2-1	Great Harwood Town
68	Langford	0-1	Great Yarmouth Town
69	Canvey Island	1-7	Halstead Town
73	Eynesbury Rovers	0-2	Haverhill Rovers
86	Ossett Town	2-3	Knowsley United
92	Princes End United	1-0	Louth United
98	Vauxhall Motors	0-5	Molesey
102	Eastwood Town	2-1	Newtown
107	Long Eaton United	0-1	Oakham United
108	Wolverton	2-1	Oldbury United
112	Emley	2-1	Prescot
118	Rainham Town	1-2	Royston Town
121	Uxbridge	1-2	Salisbury
122	Torrington	2-5	Saltash United
131	Banbury United	1-1	Solihull Borough
135	Saffron Walden Town	2-1	Stowmarket Town
137	Rocester	1-0	Sutton Town
140	Southall	1-3	Tilbury
144	Hastings Town	0-2	Tooting & Mitcham United
146	Corinthian Casuals	1-0	Ware
151	Stroud	3-0	Westbury United
153	Brigg Town	1-1	Willenhall Town
156	Barton Rovers	2-1	Wisbech Town

=== 2nd replays ===
Tie	Home team	Score	Away team
131	Solihull Borough	2-2	Banbury United
153	Brigg Town	1-3	Willenhall Town

=== 3rd replay ===
Tie	Home team	Score	Away team
131	Banbury United	3-4	Solihull Borough

== 1st qualifying round ==
=== Ties ===
Tie	Home team	Score	Away team
1	Abingdon United	0-1	Farnborough Town
2	Accrington Stanley	3-0	West Auckland Town
3	Alnwick Town	0-5	Fleetwood Town
4	Altrincham	3-2	Rhyl
5	Alvechurch	4-1	Wellingborough Town
6	Andover	3-0	Horsham Y M C A
7	Armthorpe Welfare	1-2	Southport
8	Banstead Athletic	3-3	Molesey
9	Barkingside	1-3	Redbridge Forest
10	Barry Town	0-0	Clevedon Town
11	Barton Rovers	0-2	Redditch United
12	Beckenham Town	0-2	Flackwell Heath
13	Bedworth United	1-5	Sutton Coldfield Town
14	Biggleswade Town	2-2	Hornchurch
15	Billingham Town	1-2	Guisborough Town
16	Bilston Town	6-0	Wednesfield
17	Blakenall	3-2	Rushall Olympic
18	Blyth Spartans	2-0	Bridlington Town
19	Boreham Wood	0-0	Baker Perkins
20	Boston	0-3	Bromsgrove Rovers
21	Boston United	7-0	Lowestoft Town
22	Bournemouth	2-1	Abingdon Town
23	Brackley Town	1-1	Buckingham Town
24	Bristol Manor Farm	1-1	Bridgend Town
25	Burton Albion	2-0	Halesowen Harriers
26	Caernarfon Town w/o-scr Denaby United		
27	Carshalton Athletic	3-0	Erith & Belvedere
28	Chalfont St Peter	2-6	Malvern Town
29	Chard Town	4-4	Romsey Town
30	Cheltenham Town	2-2	Exmouth Town
31	Chesham United	0-0	Hertford Town
32	Chippenham Town	1-1	A F C Lymington
33	Chorley	4-0	Mossley
34	Clapton	0-2	Barnet
35	Colne Dynamoes scr-w/o Easington Colliery		
36	Corby Town	3-0	Solihull Borough
37	Corinthian Casuals	1-5	Grays Athletic
38	Cove	1-3	Windsor & Eton
39	Cray Wanderers	2-3	Ruislip Manor
40	Dagenham	1-1	Burnham
41	Dover Athletic	1-0	Ashford Town (Kent)
42	Droylsden	1-1	Stalybridge Celtic
43	Durham City	0-3	Prudhoe East End
44	Eastbourne United	0-3	Crawley Town
45	Eastwood Town	1-1	Hednesford Town
46	Edgware Town	1-0	Harrow Borough
47	Egham Town	2-1	Purfleet
48	Enfield	4-1	Barking
49	Falmouth Town	2-4	Dorchester Town
50	Farsley Celtic	0-0	Bangor City
51	Ferryhill Athletic	1-1	South Bank
52	Finchley	1-2	Great Yarmouth Town
53	Fisher Athletic	0-0	Harwich & Parkeston
54	Folkestone	1-2	Bognor Regis Town
55	Ford United	3-1	St Albans City
56	Frickley Athletic	4-3	Gainsborough Trinity
57	Gretna	5-1	Norton & Stockton Ancients
58	Hampton	0-1	Hailsham Town
59	Harrogate Railway Athletic	2-0	Murton
60	Harrogate Town	1-3	Esh Winning
61	Harworth Colliery Institute	1-2	Atherton Laburnum Rovers
62	Havant Town	4-0	Langney Sports
63	Haverhill Rovers	1-1	V S Rugby
64	Herne Bay	0-1	Lewes
65	Hinckley Athletic	2-1	Grantham Town
66	Histon	2-1	Rothwell Town
67	Hitchin Town	0-1	Braintree Town
68	Hounslow	4-3	Basildon United
69	Ilkeston Town	2-3	Bootle
70	Kingstonian	2-1	Staines Town
71	Knowsley United	0-0	Colwyn Bay
72	Lancaster City	1-0	Darwen
73	Langley Park Welfare	2-1	Tow Law Town
74	Leicester United	1-0	Rocester
75	Leyton Wingate	0-0	Billericay Town
76	Liskeard Athletic	5-2	Wimborne Town
77	Littlehampton Town	2-0	Dulwich Hamlet
78	Maine Road	1-0	Glossop
79	Mangotsfield United	2-2	Bashley
80	March Town United	1-1	Sandwell Borough
81	Margate	2-2	Gravesend & Northfleet
82	Marlow	3-0	Merstham
83	Melksham Town	2-1	Calne Town
84	Metropolitan Police	1-3	Hendon
85	Moor Green	1-2	Tamworth
86	Morecambe	2-2	Horwich R M I
87	Newmarket Town	1-2	Cambridge City
88	North Shields	1-1	Gateshead
89	Northallerton Town	2-0	Billingham Synthonia
90	Nuneaton Borough	1-0	Goole Town
91	Oakham United	1-2	Hyde United
92	Paget Rangers	1-2	Princes End United
93	Pagham	4-0	Oakwood
94	Peacehaven & Telscombe	4-1	Southwick
95	Potton United	1-1	Stourbridge
96	Racing Club Warwick	0-0	Evesham United
97	Radcliffe Borough	0-0	Emley
98	Rayners Lane	0-3	Harlow Town
99	Redhill	2-3	Whitehawk
100	Royston Town	3-2	Yeading
101	Ryhope Community Association	1-2	Consett
102	Saffron Walden Town	0-4	Wealdstone
103	Salisbury	2-0	Hungerford Town
104	Saltash United	1-1	Poole Town
105	Seaham Red Star	1-1	Evenwood Town
106	Shepshed Charterhouse	3-1	Lye Town
107	Shildon	2-1	Cleator Moor Celtic
108	Sittingbourne	1-1	Whitstable Town
109	Slough Town	8-0	Feltham
110	South Liverpool	2-0	Warrington Town
111	Spalding United	0-3	Rushden Town
112	St Blazey	0-2	Weymouth
113	St Helens Town	0-3	Curzon Ashton
114	Stevenage Borough	2-3	Bishop's Stortford
115	Stockton	0-2	Spennymoor United
116	Stratford Town	1-4	Buxton
117	Stroud	4-1	Gosport Borough
118	Sudbury Town	1-3	Heybridge Swifts
119	Taunton Town	1-2	Swanage Town & Herston
120	Tilbury	1-1	Witney Town
121	Tiverton Town	5-1	Ilfracombe Town
122	Tonbridge	3-1	Hythe Town
123	Tooting & Mitcham United	0-0	Horsham
124	Trowbridge Town	3-0	Newbury Town
125	Vauxhall G M	0-2	Irlam Town
126	Walthamstow Pennant	0-3	Chelmsford City
127	Walton & Hersham	2-3	Bromley
128	Warminster Town	0-1	Wokingham Town
129	Waterlooville	1-1	Newport I O W
130	Wembley	4-1	Bourne Town
131	West Midlands Police	0-6	Matlock Town
132	Weston Super Mare	2-2	Maesteg Park
133	Whitby Town	4-7	Newcastle Blue Star
134	Whyteleafe	2-1	Slade Green
135	Wick	0-3	Dorking
136	Willenhall Town	0-0	Marine
137	Witton Albion	2-0	Congleton Town
138	Wivenhoe Town	3-1	Halstead Town
139	Wolverton	2-2	Atherstone United
140	Workington	1-1	Horden Colliery Welfare
141	Worksop Town	2-1	Gresley Rovers
142	Worthing	3-0	Chatham Town
143	Wycombe Wanderers	3-0	Maidenhead United
144	Yate Town	1-3	Worcester City

=== Replays ===
Tie	Home team	Score	Away team
8	Molesey	2-0	Banstead Athletic
10	Clevedon Town	0-3	Barry Town
14	Hornchurch	3-1	Biggleswade Town
19	Baker Perkins	1-2	Boreham Wood
23	Buckingham Town	1-1	Brackley Town
24	Bridgend Town	3-0	Bristol Manor Farm
29	Romsey Town	3-0	Chard Town
30	Exmouth Town	3-3	Cheltenham Town
31	Hertford Town	1-5	Chesham United
32	A F C Lymington	1-0	Chippenham Town
40	Burnham	1-2	Dagenham
42	Stalybridge Celtic	1-2	Droylsden
45	Hednesford Town	1-1	Eastwood Town
50	Bangor City	3-0	Farsley Celtic
51	South Bank	1-0	Ferryhill Athletic
53	Harwich & Parkeston	2-1	Fisher Athletic
63	V S Rugby	5-0	Haverhill Rovers
71	Colwyn Bay	3-0	Knowsley United
75	Billericay Town	1-0	Leyton Wingate
79	Bashley	6-3	Mangotsfield United
80	Sandwell Borough	2-2	March Town United
81	Gravesend & Northfleet	1-4	Margate
86	Horwich R M I	3-0	Morecambe
88	Gateshead	0-1	North Shields
95	Stourbridge	7-0	Potton United
96	Evesham United	5-1	Racing Club Warwick
97	Emley	1-0	Radcliffe Borough
104	Poole Town	2-2	Saltash United
105	Evenwood Town	0-1	Seaham Red Star
108	Whitstable Town	1-4	Sittingbourne
120	Witney Town	2-1	Tilbury
123	Horsham	1-2	Tooting & Mitcham United
129	Newport I O W	3-0	Waterlooville
132	Maesteg Park	0-4	Weston Super Mare
136	Marine	2-2	Willenhall Town
139	Atherstone United	4-1	Wolverton
140	Horden Colliery Welfare	2-1	Workington

=== 2nd replays ===
Tie	Home team	Score	Away team
23	Buckingham Town	2-0	Brackley Town
30	Cheltenham Town	3-0	Exmouth Town
45	Eastwood Town	2-3	Hednesford Town
80	Sandwell Borough	1-0	March Town United
104	Saltash United	3-1	Poole Town
136	Marine	4-1	Willenhall Town

== 2nd qualifying round ==
=== Ties ===
Tie	Home team	Score	Away team
1	A F C Lymington	1-1	Wokingham Town
2	Accrington Stanley	2-1	Blyth Spartans
3	Alvechurch	2-7	Witton Albion
4	Andover	2-0	Bromley
5	Atherton Laburnum Rovers	0-0	Bangor City
6	Barry Town	0-2	Bashley
7	Billericay Town	1-0	Edgware Town
8	Bilston Town	2-1	Buxton
9	Blakenall	3-3	Nuneaton Borough
10	Bootle	2-0	Southport
11	Boreham Wood	1-0	Rushden Town
12	Boston United	3-1	V S Rugby
13	Braintree Town	0-2	Barnet
14	Bridgend Town	1-7	Worcester City
15	Buckingham Town	2-4	Shepshed Charterhouse
16	Burton Albion	4-0	Hinckley Athletic
17	Caernarfon Town	2-6	Colwyn Bay
18	Chesham United	0-3	Enfield
19	Corby Town	2-0	Matlock Town
20	Dorking	2-0	Carshalton Athletic
21	Dover Athletic	2-0	Sittingbourne
22	Easington Colliery	1-1	Langley Park Welfare
23	Egham Town	1-0	Witney Town
24	Emley	0-1	Chorley
25	Esh Winning	1-3	Spennymoor United
26	Evesham United	1-2	Atherstone United
27	Flackwell Heath	2-2	Grays Athletic
28	Great Yarmouth Town	0-4	Cambridge City
29	Gretna	2-2	Guisborough Town
30	Harlow Town	1-0	Ford United
31	Harrogate Railway Athletic	1-0	South Bank
32	Harwich & Parkeston	1-3	Redbridge Forest
33	Havant Town	0-4	Kingstonian
34	Hednesford Town	2-2	Hyde United
35	Histon	1-1	Redditch United
36	Horden Colliery Welfare	0-3	Northallerton Town
37	Hornchurch	1-2	Chelmsford City
38	Hounslow	1-5	Bishop's Stortford
39	Irlam Town	1-3	Horwich R M I
40	Lancaster City	2-2	Newcastle Blue Star
41	Leicester United	0-0	Droylsden
42	Lewes	0-3	Hailsham Town
43	Liskeard Athletic	5-1	Dorchester Town
44	Maine Road	0-1	Altrincham
45	Malvern Town	3-3	Tamworth
46	Marlow	2-2	Royston Town
47	Melksham Town	0-2	Newport I O W
48	Molesey	1-2	Dagenham
49	Pagham	0-3	Windsor & Eton
50	Peacehaven & Telscombe	3-1	Bognor Regis Town
51	Princes End United	0-4	Frickley Athletic
52	Prudhoe East End	0-1	North Shields
53	Romsey Town	1-0	Stroud
54	Ruislip Manor	2-1	Hendon
55	Salisbury	4-0	Bournemouth
56	Sandwell Borough	0-2	Bromsgrove Rovers
57	Seaham Red Star	1-1	Consett
58	Shildon	0-4	Fleetwood Town
59	Slough Town	2-3	Farnborough Town
60	South Liverpool	1-0	Curzon Ashton
61	Stourbridge	1-2	Sutton Coldfield Town
62	Swanage Town & Herston	1-1	Weymouth
63	Tiverton Town	4-2	Saltash United
64	Tooting & Mitcham United	1-2	Littlehampton Town
65	Trowbridge Town	0-0	Wycombe Wanderers
66	Wembley	2-2	Heybridge Swifts
67	Weston Super Mare	0-2	Cheltenham Town
68	Whitehawk	0-1	Margate
69	Whyteleafe	0-2	Tonbridge
70	Wivenhoe Town	0-0	Wealdstone
71	Worksop Town	1-3	Marine
72	Worthing	3-2	Crawley Town

=== Replays ===
Tie	Home team	Score	Away team
1	Wokingham Town	2-1	A F C Lymington
5	Bangor City	4-0	Atherton Laburnum Rovers
9	Nuneaton Borough	3-0	Blakenall
22	Langley Park Welfare	0-1	Easington Colliery
27	Grays Athletic	2-0	Flackwell Heath
29	Guisborough Town	1-3	Gretna
34	Hyde United	5-2	Hednesford Town
35	Redditch United	1-0	Histon
40	Newcastle Blue Star	2-0	Lancaster City
41	Droylsden	2-2	Leicester United
45	Tamworth	5-1	Malvern Town
46	Royston Town	0-2	Marlow
57	Consett	2-0	Seaham Red Star
62	Weymouth	2-1	Swanage Town & Herston
65	Wycombe Wanderers	2-1	Trowbridge Town
66	Heybridge Swifts	3-1	Wembley
70	Wealdstone	2-1	Wivenhoe Town

=== 2nd replay ===
Tie	Home team	Score	Away team
41	Leicester United	4-3	Droylsden

== 3rd qualifying round ==
=== Ties ===
Tie	Home team	Score	Away team
1	Accrington Stanley	2-1	Gretna
2	Altrincham	3-0	Bangor City
3	Andover	0-1	Marlow
4	Bashley	2-2	Weymouth
5	Bishop's Stortford	2-1	Redbridge Forest
6	Boreham Wood	1-1	Boston United
7	Cheltenham Town	4-2	Worcester City
8	Chorley	6-2	Bootle
9	Corby Town	0-1	Burton Albion
10	Dagenham	3-1	Grays Athletic
11	Dorking	1-1	Worthing
12	Egham Town	1-1	Billericay Town
13	Enfield	1-1	Chelmsford City
14	Fleetwood Town	2-0	North Shields
15	Frickley Athletic	1-0	Nuneaton Borough
16	Harlow Town	1-3	Barnet
17	Harrogate Railway Athletic	2-0	Easington Colliery
18	Heybridge Swifts	1-0	Cambridge City
19	Horwich R M I	1-3	Colwyn Bay
20	Hyde United	1-1	South Liverpool
21	Kingstonian	4-0	Hailsham Town
22	Leicester United	0-2	Marine
23	Littlehampton Town	0-0	Tonbridge
24	Newcastle Blue Star	3-0	Consett
25	Newport I O W	0-1	Romsey Town
26	Peacehaven & Telscombe	1-0	Margate
27	Ruislip Manor	1-0	Wealdstone
28	Salisbury	0-3	Farnborough Town
29	Shepshed Charterhouse	2-3	Atherstone United
30	Spennymoor United	2-0	Northallerton Town
31	Sutton Coldfield Town	0-0	Bromsgrove Rovers
32	Tamworth	2-0	Redditch United
33	Tiverton Town	1-0	Liskeard Athletic
34	Windsor & Eton	1-1	Dover Athletic
35	Witton Albion	4-0	Bilston Town
36	Wycombe Wanderers	4-1	Wokingham Town

=== Replays ===
Tie	Home team	Score	Away team
4	Weymouth	2-3	Bashley
6	Boston United	4-0	Boreham Wood
11	Worthing	2-4	Dorking
12	Billericay Town	1-2	Egham Town
13	Chelmsford City	1-0	Enfield
20	South Liverpool	3-1	Hyde United
23	Tonbridge	2-3	Littlehampton Town
31	Bromsgrove Rovers	4-2	Sutton Coldfield Town
34	Dover Athletic	3-0	Windsor & Eton

== 4th qualifying round ==
The teams that given byes to this round are Runcorn, Macclesfield Town, Kettering Town, Welling United, Yeovil Town, Merthyr Tydfil, Telford United, Kidderminster Harriers, Northwich Victoria, Stafford Rangers, Bath City, Aylesbury United, Halesowen Town, Hayes, Dartford, Gloucester City, Bishop Auckland, Basingstoke Town, Woking and Whitley Bay.

=== Ties ===
Tie	Home team	Score	Away team
1	Accrington Stanley	0-2	Fleetwood Town
2	Barnet	3-1	Heybridge Swifts
3	Bishop Auckland	1-0	South Liverpool
4	Bishop's Stortford	0-1	Atherstone United
5	Bromsgrove Rovers	1-2	Kidderminster Harriers
6	Burton Albion	0-0	Tamworth
7	Chelmsford City	0-0	Kettering Town
8	Chorley	3-1	Harrogate Railway Athletic
9	Colwyn Bay	1-4	Whitley Bay
10	Dagenham	0-2	Aylesbury United
11	Dartford	1-1	Boston United
12	Dorking	2-3	Cheltenham Town
13	Dover Athletic	0-0	Merthyr Tydfil
14	Farnborough Town	4-1	Gloucester City
15	Frickley Athletic	0-2	Witton Albion
16	Halesowen Town	5-2	Ruislip Manor
17	Hayes	2-0	Kingstonian
18	Macclesfield Town	2-2	Altrincham
19	Marine	1-1	Stafford Rangers
20	Northwich Victoria	1-1	Spennymoor United
21	Romsey Town	1-2	Littlehampton Town
22	Runcorn	1-0	Newcastle Blue Star
23	Telford United	2-0	Egham Town
24	Tiverton Town	3-2	Peacehaven & Telscombe
25	Welling United	1-0	Bashley
26	Woking	2-1	Bath City
27	Wycombe Wanderers	6-0	Basingstoke Town
28	Yeovil Town	3-1	Marlow

=== Replays ===
Tie	Home team	Score	Away team
6	Tamworth	3-2	Burton Albion
7	Kettering Town	1-2	Chelmsford City
11	Boston United	2-1	Dartford
13	Merthyr Tydfil	2-0	Dover Athletic
18	Altrincham	3-0	Macclesfield Town
19	Stafford Rangers	2-1	Marine
20	Spennymoor United	2-1	Northwich Victoria

== 1990-91 FA Cup ==
See 1990-91 FA Cup for details of the rounds from the first round proper onwards.
