= 1974–75 FA Cup qualifying rounds =

Tournament details
- Country: England; Wales

The FA Cup 1974–75 is the 94th season of the world's oldest football knockout competition; The Football Association Challenge Cup, or FA Cup for short. The large number of clubs entering the tournament from lower down the English football league system meant that the competition started with a number of preliminary and qualifying rounds. The 28 victorious teams from the fourth round qualifying progressed to the first round proper.

== Preliminary round ==
=== Ties ===
Tie	Home team	Score	Away team
1	Bacup Borough	3–3	Accrington Stanley
2	Basingstoke Town	1–0	Andover
3	Bedworth United	0–1	Alfreton Town
4	Boldon Colliery Welfare	4–0	West Auckland Town
5	Burgess Hill Town	2–2	Arundel
6	Cinderford Town	2–2	Barry Town
7	Clitheroe	4–8	Barrow
8	Corby Town	2–1	Cambridge City
9	Corinthian Casuals	4–2	Barking
10	Cray Wanderers	4–2	Aveley
11	Dagenham	2–2	Bromley
12	Darlaston	1–2	Bilston
13	Deal Town	0–4	Ashford Town (Kent)
14	Devizes Town	2–3	Bath City
15	Dorchester Town	3–2	Bridgwater Town
16	Eastbourne United	2–3	Bexhill Town
17	Edmonton & Haringey	2–1	Cheshunt
18	Egham Town	1–3	Addlestone
19	Epping Town	3–0	Boreham Wood
20	Evenwood Town	2–2	Spennymoor United
21	Hampton	2–0	Burnham
22	Marine w/o-scr Ormskirk		
23	Marlow	3–3	Aylesbury United

=== Replays ===
Tie	Home team	Score	Away team
1	Accrington Stanley	4–1	Bacup Borough
5	Arundel	1–1	Burgess Hill Town
6	Barry Town	0–0	Cinderford Town (Abandoned in extra time)
11	Bromley	2–4	Dagenham
20	Spennymoor United	4–0	Evenwood Town
23	Aylesbury United	1–1	Marlow

=== 2nd replays ===
Tie	Home team	Score	Away team
5	Burgess Hill Town	1–0	Arundel
6	Cinderford Town	2–0	Barry Town
23	Marlow	1–0	Aylesbury United

== 1st qualifying round ==
=== Ties ===
Tie	Home team	Score	Away team
1	Accrington Stanley	1–1	Radcliffe Borough
2	Addlestone	0–0	Wokingham Town
3	Alfreton Town	1–1	Tamworth
4	Alton Town	3–2	Newport I O W
5	Alvechurch	3–0	Sutton Coldfield Town
6	Arnold	0–0	Ilkeston Town
7	Ashby Institute	0–1	Worksop Town
8	Ashford Town (Kent)	0–0	Sittingbourne
9	Ashington	2–1	Horden Colliery Welfare
10	Ashton United	1–0	Great Harwood
11	Atherstone Town	5–1	Hinckley Athletic
12	Barnstaple Town	0–4	Wadebridge Town
13	Barrow	1–0	Rossendale United
14	Barton Town	2–2	Winterton Rangers
15	Basingstoke Town	3–1	Waterlooville
16	Bath City	3–0	Weston Super Mare
17	Bedford Town	2–1	Wellingborough Town
18	Belper Town	0–0	Stafford Rangers
19	Bethesda Athletic	1–0	South Liverpool
20	Bexhill Town	0–6	Southwick
21	Bexley United	0–1	Grays Athletic
22	Biggleswade & District	0–0	Potton United
23	Bilston	3–0	Stourbridge
24	Bishop Auckland w/o-scr Stanley United		
25	Blaenau Ffestiniog	0–0	Oswestry Town
26	Bognor Regis Town	1–2	Horsham
27	Boldon Colliery Welfare	2–3	Shildon
28	Boston	4–0	Spalding United
29	Bourne Town	1–0	Louth United
30	Bracknell Town	1–3	Wimbledon
31	Bridlington Town	1–0	South Bank
32	Bridport	1–6	Poole Town
33	Brierley Hill Alliance	1–2	Kidderminster Harriers
34	Brigg Town	0–1	Matlock Town
35	Bromsgrove Rovers	0–3	Worcester City
36	Burgess Hill Town	2–0	Worthing
37	Burscough	0–1	Lancaster City
38	Burton Albion	0–0	Heanor Town
39	Bury Town	4–1	Thetford Town
40	Buxton	0–1	Runcorn
41	Canterbury City	4–0	Herne Bay
42	Carshalton Athletic	0–1	Leytonstone
43	Chatteris Town	0–2	St Neots Town
44	Cheltenham Town	3–2	Llanelli
45	Chesham United	1–0	Vauxhall Motors
46	Chippenham Town	3–0	Melksham Town
47	Cinderford Town	3–2	Ton Pentre
48	Clacton Town	1–0	Harwich & Parkeston
49	Corby Town	2–0	Wisbech Town
50	Corinthian Casuals	1–2	Wembley
51	Coventry Sporting	1–0	Moor Green
52	Crawley Town	3–0	Peacehaven & Telscombe
53	Cray Wanderers	2–0	Walthamstow Avenue
54	Crook Town	1–4	Wingate (Durham)
55	Croydon	0–2	Leatherhead
56	Dagenham	3–1	Tilbury
57	Dorchester Town	1–3	Weymouth
58	Droylsden	1–1	Yorkshire Amateur
59	Dudley Town	1–3	A P Leamington
60	Dunstable Town	3–2	Hertford Town
61	Eastbourne Town	0–0	Maidstone United
62	Eastwood Hanley	1–3	Mossley
63	Edgware Town	1–2	Harlow Town
64	Edmonton & Haringey	0–1	Ware
65	Emley	4–1	Glossop
66	Enderby Town	3–1	Long Eaton United
67	Epping Town	0–0	St Albans City
68	Erith & Belvedere	5–0	Leyton
69	Falmouth Town	2–0	Newquay
70	Fareham Town	1–1	Littlehampton Town
71	Farnborough Town	1–1	Staines Town
72	Ferryhill Athletic	0–3	Tow Law Town
73	Finchley	0–1	Hoddesdon Town
74	Fleetwood	0–2	Netherfield
75	Folkestone & Shepway	0–0	Ramsgate
76	Formby	0–2	Horwich R M I
77	Frickley Colliery	2–2	Stalybridge Celtic
78	Gainsborough Trinity	5–1	Mexborough Town
79	Glastonbury	2–2	Taunton Town
80	Gloucester City	3–2	Merthyr Tydfil
81	Goole Town	3–0	Stockton
82	Gosport Borough	7–1	Ryde Sports
83	Great Yarmouth Town	3–3	Lowestoft Town
84	Gresley Rovers	1–0	Hednesford Town
85	Halesowen Town	1–2	Lye Town
86	Hampton	2–2	Wealdstone
87	Harrow Borough	0–0	Molesey
88	Hastings United	0–0	Tonbridge
89	Hemel Hempstead	2–3	Hitchin Town
90	Highgate United	2–1	Oldbury United
91	Hornchurch	2–1	Metropolitan Police
92	Irthlingborough Diamonds	3–1	Rothwell Town
93	King's Lynn	9–0	Parson Drove United
94	Leek Town	1–2	Nantwich Town
95	Letchworth Town	1–0	Hatfield Town
96	Lewes	2–4	Ringmer
97	Macclesfield Town	2–0	Congleton Town
98	Maidenhead United	4–1	Windsor & Eton
99	Mangotsfield United	2–1	Trowbridge Town
100	March Town United	2–1	Soham Town Rangers
101	Marine	4–1	Witton Albion
102	Marlow	0–1	Wycombe Wanderers
103	Medway	4–2	Whitstable Town
104	New Brighton	2–1	Porthmadog
105	New Mills	0–1	Hyde United
106	Northwich Victoria	2–3	Sandbach Ramblers
107	Nuneaton Borough	3–0	Banbury United
108	Oxford City	1–1	Witney Town
109	Pagham	3–3	Chichester City
110	Penrith	0–3	Darwen
111	Penzance	1–2	Bideford
112	Prestwich Heys	0–0	Chorley
113	Redditch United	2–1	Gornal Athletic
114	Redhill	3–0	Epsom & Ewell
115	Retford Town	3–0	Denaby United
116	Rhyl w/o-scr Ellesmere Port Town		
117	Romford	2–0	Gravesend & Northfleet
118	Rushden Town	2–1	Desborough Town
119	Salisbury	3–0	Cowes
120	Sheppey United	1–3	Dover
121	Sidley United	1–3	Haywards Heath
122	Skegness Town	3–0	Holbeach United
123	Southall	0–0	Tooting & Mitcham United
124	Spennymoor United	6–2	Durham City
125	St Blazey	1–1	Minehead
126	St Helens Town	0–1	Skelmersdale United
127	Stamford	1–3	Histon
128	Stevenage Athletic	1–0	Enfield
129	Stocksbridge Works	1–3	Farsley Celtic
130	Stonehouse	1–1	Everwarm
131	Sudbury Town	5–0	Ely City
132	Sutton Town	0–2	Eastwood Town
133	Sutton United	4–2	Dulwich Hamlet
134	Tunbridge Wells	0–0	Faversham Town
135	Uxbridge	2–1	Hounslow
136	Warley County Borough	2–0	Evesham United
137	Welton Rovers	1–1	Frome Town
138	Westbury United	1–3	Hungerford Town
139	Whitby Town	1–1	Bridlington Trinity
140	Whitley Bay	1–1	North Shields
141	Willington	4–1	Consett
142	Winsford United	5–1	Prescot Town
143	Woking	2–2	Kingstonian
144	Wolverton Town & B R	1–2	Milton Keynes City

=== Replays ===
Tie	Home team	Score	Away team
1	Radcliffe Borough	0–1	Accrington Stanley
2	Wokingham Town	1–1	Addlestone
3	Tamworth	1–0	Alfreton Town
6	Ilkeston Town	0–1	Arnold
8	Sittingbourne	1–2	Ashford Town (Kent)
14	Winterton Rangers	1–0	Barton Town
18	Stafford Rangers	4–0	Belper Town
22	Potton United	2–1	Biggleswade & District
25	Oswestry Town	1–0	Blaenau Ffestiniog
38	Heanor Town	1–3	Burton Albion
58	Yorkshire Amateur	4–4	Droylsden
61	Maidstone United	5–3	Eastbourne Town
67	St Albans City	2–2	Epping Town
70	Littlehampton Town	1–1	Fareham Town
71	Staines Town	0–1	Farnborough Town
75	Ramsgate	2–0	Folkestone & Shepway
77	Stalybridge Celtic	2–0	Frickley Colliery
79	Taunton Town	4–0	Glastonbury
83	Lowestoft Town	3–2	Great Yarmouth Town
86	Wealdstone	2–0	Hampton
87	Molesey	0–1	Harrow Borough
88	Tonbridge	1–2	Hastings United
108	Witney Town	0–0	Oxford City
109	Chichester City	5–4	Pagham
112	Chorley	6–1	Prestwich Heys
123	Tooting & Mitcham United	3–1	Southall
125	Minehead	4–1	St Blazey
130	Everwarm	4–1	Stonehouse
134	Faversham Town	3–2	Tunbridge Wells
137	Frome Town	1–2	Welton Rovers
139	Bridlington Trinity	0–1	Whitby Town
140	North Shields	1–3	Whitley Bay
143	Kingstonian	1–2	Woking

=== 2nd replays ===
Tie	Home team	Score	Away team
2	Addlestone	1–3	Wokingham Town
58	Droylsden	0–1	Yorkshire Amateur
67	Epping Town	1–2	St Albans City
70	Fareham Town	0–1	Littlehampton Town
108	Oxford City	1–0	Witney Town

== 2nd qualifying round ==
=== Ties ===
Tie	Home team	Score	Away team
1	A P Leamington	3–1	Lye Town
2	Accrington Stanley	2–0	Chorley
3	Alton Town	2–2	Gosport Borough
4	Alvechurch	1–3	Nuneaton Borough
5	Arnold	0–0	Enderby Town
6	Ashford Town (Kent)	1–0	Dover
7	Ashton United	0–2	Horwich R M I
8	Atherstone Town	5–0	Coventry Sporting
9	Barrow	0–2	Darwen
10	Basingstoke Town	1–1	Salisbury
11	Bath City	6–1	Hungerford Town
12	Bedford Town	2–0	Rushden Town
13	Bethesda Athletic	2–2	Rhyl
14	Bilston	0–2	Redditch United
15	Boston	1–1	Skegness Town
16	Bourne Town	2–2	King's Lynn
17	Bridlington Town	1–0	Goole Town
18	Burgess Hill Town	4–1	Chichester City
19	Burton Albion	0–0	Gresley Rovers
20	Bury Town	0–2	Sudbury Town
21	Canterbury City	2–1	Ramsgate
22	Cheltenham Town	4–1	Gloucester City
23	Chesham United	4–1	Oxford City
24	Chippenham Town	0–2	Mangotsfield United
25	Cinderford Town	2–1	Everwarm
26	Clacton Town	3–0	Lowestoft Town
27	Corby Town	3–2	Histon
28	Crawley Town	2–2	Ringmer
29	Cray Wanderers	1–5	Sutton United
30	Dagenham	3–0	Redhill
31	Dunstable Town	0–0	Hitchin Town
32	Emley	3–1	Stalybridge Celtic
33	Farnborough Town	2–2	Tooting & Mitcham United
34	Grays Athletic	0–1	Erith & Belvedere
35	Harlow Town	1–0	Hoddesdon Town
36	Horsham	1–0	Littlehampton Town
37	Kidderminster Harriers	5–2	Highgate United
38	Lancaster City	2–1	Netherfield
39	Leatherhead	5–0	Hornchurch
40	Leytonstone	1–0	Harrow Borough
41	Maidstone United	6–0	Hastings United
42	Marine	1–1	Winsford United
43	Matlock Town	2–1	Gainsborough Trinity
44	Medway	2–1	Faversham Town
45	Minehead	3–2	Falmouth Town
46	Mossley	5–1	Nantwich Town
47	Oswestry Town	2–1	New Brighton
48	Poole Town	2–0	Taunton Town
49	Potton United	5–3	Irthlingborough Diamonds
50	Runcorn	3–0	Hyde United
51	Sandbach Ramblers	2–1	Skelmersdale United
52	Shildon	2–4	Willington
53	Southwick	3–2	Haywards Heath
54	Spennymoor United	3–0	Wingate (Durham)
55	St Albans City	1–0	Letchworth Town
56	St Neots Town	2–3	March Town United
57	Stafford Rangers	3–0	Macclesfield Town
58	Tamworth	1–1	Eastwood Town
59	Tow Law Town	0–4	Ashington
60	Wadebridge Town	3–3	Bideford
61	Ware	0–3	Stevenage Athletic
62	Wealdstone	2–0	Uxbridge
63	Wembley	2–3	Romford
64	Weymouth	7–1	Welton Rovers
65	Whitley Bay	2–2	Bishop Auckland
66	Wimbledon	4–0	Maidenhead United
67	Winterton Rangers	3–2	Whitby Town
68	Wokingham Town	2–1	Woking
69	Worcester City	5–0	Warley County Borough
70	Worksop Town	1–0	Retford Town
71	Wycombe Wanderers	2–0	Milton Keynes City
72	Yorkshire Amateur	0–2	Farsley Celtic

=== Replays ===
Tie	Home team	Score	Away team
3	Gosport Borough	0–1	Alton Town
5	Enderby Town	1–0	Arnold
10	Salisbury	3–1	Basingstoke Town
13	Rhyl	2–2	Bethesda Athletic
15	Skegness Town	1–2	Boston
16	King's Lynn	1–0	Bourne Town
19	Gresley Rovers	0–1	Burton Albion
28	Ringmer	2–1	Crawley Town
31	Hitchin Town	2–1	Dunstable Town
33	Tooting & Mitcham United	6–1	Farnborough Town
42	Winsford United	1–4	Marine
58	Eastwood Town	5–3	Tamworth
60	Bideford	4–2	Wadebridge Town
65	Bishop Auckland	4–3	Whitley Bay

=== 2nd replay ===
Tie	Home team	Score	Away team
13	Bethesda Athletic	0–3	Rhyl

== 3rd qualifying round ==
=== Ties ===
Tie	Home team	Score	Away team
1	A P Leamington	2–1	Worcester City
2	Alton Town	1–3	Salisbury
3	Ashington	2–2	Willington
4	Atherstone Town	1–1	Nuneaton Borough
5	Bishop Auckland	4–2	Spennymoor United
6	Bridlington Town	1–1	Winterton Rangers
7	Burton Albion	0–0	Stafford Rangers
8	Canterbury City	2–2	Ashford Town (Kent)
9	Cheltenham Town	3–2	Cinderford Town
10	Chesham United	1–3	Wycombe Wanderers
11	Clacton Town	2–1	Sudbury Town
12	Emley	1–2	Farsley Celtic
13	Enderby Town	1–0	Eastwood Town
14	Erith & Belvedere	1–5	Sutton United
15	Harlow Town	0–0	Stevenage Athletic
16	Hitchin Town	2–1	St Albans City
17	Horsham	5–0	Burgess Hill Town
18	Horwich R M I	0–2	Accrington Stanley
19	Kidderminster Harriers	1–1	Redditch United
20	King's Lynn	1–0	Boston
21	Lancaster City	3–0	Darwen
22	Leatherhead	0–0	Dagenham
23	Leytonstone	0–1	Romford
24	Maidstone United	7–0	Medway
25	Mangotsfield United	1–3	Bath City
26	March Town United	0–4	Corby Town
27	Matlock Town	6–2	Worksop Town
28	Minehead	2–1	Bideford
29	Mossley	1–0	Runcorn
30	Oswestry Town	2–1	Rhyl
31	Poole Town	0–3	Weymouth
32	Potton United	1–2	Bedford Town
33	Ringmer	1–3	Southwick
34	Sandbach Ramblers	0–1	Marine
35	Tooting & Mitcham United	1–0	Wealdstone
36	Wimbledon	2–0	Wokingham Town

=== Replays ===
Tie	Home team	Score	Away team
3	Willington	1–5	Ashington
4	Nuneaton Borough	2–0	Atherstone Town
6	Winterton Rangers	0–2	Bridlington Town
7	Stafford Rangers	2–0	Burton Albion
8	Ashford Town (Kent)	4–0	Canterbury City
15	Stevenage Athletic	0–2	Harlow Town
19	Redditch United	2–2	Kidderminster Harriers
22	Dagenham	1–3	Leatherhead

=== 2nd replay ===
Tie	Home team	Score	Away team
19	Kidderminster Harriers	3–0	Redditch United

== 4th qualifying round ==
The teams that given byes to this round are Scarborough, Wigan Athletic, Walton & Hersham, Slough Town, Barnet, Hendon, Telford United, Hillingdon Borough, Yeovil Town, Gateshead United, Chelmsford City, Grantham, Margate, Bangor City, Boston United, Guildford & Dorking United, Blyth Spartans, Kettering Town, Hayes and Altrincham.

=== Ties ===
Tie	Home team	Score	Away team
1	A P Leamington	1–0	Corby Town
2	Altrincham	3–0	Accrington Stanley
3	Ashington	1–3	Gateshead United
4	Barnet	1–1	Hitchin Town
5	Bath City	2–1	Yeovil Town
6	Blyth Spartans	3–1	Scarborough
7	Bridlington Town	0–4	Farsley Celtic
8	Cheltenham Town	4–1	Salisbury
9	Clacton Town	1–2	Romford
10	Enderby Town	1–2	Boston United
11	Guildford & Dorking United	0–3	Wimbledon
12	Hendon	0–2	Maidstone United
13	Hillingdon Borough	1–2	Ashford Town (Kent)
14	Horsham	1–3	Chelmsford City
15	Kettering Town	3–3	Bedford Town
16	King's Lynn	1–3	Stafford Rangers
17	Lancaster City	1–1	Bishop Auckland
18	Marine	2–1	Telford United
19	Matlock Town	3–0	Bangor City
20	Minehead	0–3	Weymouth
21	Mossley	1–3	Oswestry Town
22	Nuneaton Borough	1–1	Grantham
23	Slough Town	1–0	Sutton United
24	Southwick	2–1	Hayes
25	Tooting & Mitcham United	3–0	Harlow Town
26	Walton & Hersham	1–7	Leatherhead
27	Wigan Athletic	4–0	Kidderminster Harriers
28	Wycombe Wanderers	2–1	Margate

=== Replays ===
Tie	Home team	Score	Away team
4	Hitchin Town	2–0	Barnet
15	Bedford Town	0–0	Kettering Town
17	Bishop Auckland	2–1	Lancaster City
22	Grantham	2–3	Nuneaton Borough

=== 2nd replay ===
Tie	Home team	Score	Away team
15	Kettering Town	2–0	Bedford Town

== 1974–75 FA Cup ==
See 1974-75 FA Cup for details of the rounds from the first round proper onwards.
