= 1951–52 FA Cup qualifying rounds =

Tournament details
- Country: England; Wales

The FA Cup 1951–52 is the 71st season of the world's oldest football knockout competition; The Football Association Challenge Cup, or FA Cup for short. The large number of clubs entering the tournament from lower down the English football league system meant that the competition started with a number of preliminary and qualifying rounds. The 30 victorious teams from the fourth round qualifying progressed to the first round proper.

== Preliminary round ==
=== Ties ===
Tie	Home team	Score	Away team
1	Ashby Institute	3–6	Skegness Town
2	Bedworth Town	2–2	Rugby Town
3	Bentinck Colliery Welfare	1–2	Creswell Colliery
4	Berkhamsted Town	3–1	Edgware Town
5	Bestwood Colliery	1–1	Cinderhill Colliery
6	Bognor Regis Town	1–1	Bexhill Town
7	Bourneville Athletic	1–3	Tamworth
8	Bowater Lloyds	2–2	Ramsgate Athletic
9	Bridgwater Town	2–1	Minehead
10	Brierley Hill Alliance	4–2	Lye Town
11	Buxton	2–1	Hyde United
12	Calne & Harris United	4–0	Melksham Town
13	Chippenham Town	4–0	Spencer Moulton
14	Chippenham United	4–0	Weston Super Mare
15	Chorley	2–5	Horwich R M I
16	Clevedon	1–3	Bath City
17	Congleton Town w/o-scr Glossop		
18	Darlaston	1–1	Atherstone Town
19	Dartmouth United	4–1	Oak Villa
20	Dorking w/o-scr Croydon Rovers		
21	East Grinstead	3–5	Haywards Heath
22	Epsom	3–4	Woking
23	Farnham Town	3–5	Hounslow Town
24	Faversham Town	0–3	Snowdown Colliery Welfare
25	Folkestone	4–0	Chatham Town
26	Frome Town	1–0	Devizes Town
27	Gravesend & Northfleet	2–2	Maidstone United
28	Hanham Athletic	0–7	Paulton Rovers
29	Hastings United	1–3	Ashford Town (Kent)
30	Headington United	2–2	Oxford City
31	Horsham	2–3	Eastbourne
32	Huntley & Palmers	6–2	Abingdon Town
33	Ilford	1–1	Brentwood & Warley
34	Ilminster Town	4–3	Ilfracombe Town
35	Letchworth Town	0–2	Clapton
36	Littlehampton Town	1–7	Tonbridge
37	Maidenhead United	4–1	Yiewsley
38	Margate	6–1	Canterbury City
39	Marine	4–0	Liverpool Police
40	Marlow	4–3	Hemel Hempstead
41	Metropolitan Police	2–3	Tooting & Mitcham United
42	Moor Green	2–4	Burton Albion
43	Newquay	3–1	Wadebridge Town
44	Oswestry Town	5–2	Dudley Town
45	Peasedown Miners Welfare	3–1	Bristol St George
46	Prescot Cables	3–1	Llandudno
47	Radstock Town	1–3	Wells City
48	Redhill	3–0	Chichester City
49	Sheppey United	1–3	Betteshanger Colliery Welfare
50	Sittingbourne	2–2	Deal Town
51	South Liverpool	1–1	Bangor City
52	Southwick	1–1	Lancing Athletic
53	St Austell	3–0	Tavistock
54	Stalybridge Celtic	2–2	Darwen
55	Stevenage Town	1–4	Woodford Town
56	Stourbridge	5–0	Bilston
57	Sutton Town	2–2	Linby Colliery
58	Sutton United	3–3	Carshalton Athletic
59	Taunton	1–1	Bideford
60	Tilbury	0–4	Briggs Sports
61	Tiverton Town	1–2	Barnstaple Town
62	Truro City	5–3	Newton Abbot
63	Uxbridge	3–2	Harrow Town
64	Warminster Town	3–5	Corsham Town
65	Wealdstone	2–1	Southall
66	Wellington Town	4–0	Halesowen Town
67	Westbury United	5–1	Andover
68	Whitstable	0–4	Dover
69	Wimbledon	0–1	Erith & Belvedere
70	Windsor & Eton	3–2	Bicester Town
71	Witney Town	1–3	Chesham United
72	Worthing	3–2	Shoreham

=== Replays ===
Tie	Home team	Score	Away team
2	Rugby Town	1–6	Bedworth Town
5	Cinderhill Colliery	4–0	Bestwood Colliery
6	Bexhill Town	3–0	Bognor Regis Town
8	Ramsgate Athletic	7–0	Bowater Lloyds
18	Atherstone Town	1–4	Darlaston
27	Maidstone United	0–3	Gravesend & Northfleet
30	Oxford City	0–3	Headington United
33	Brentwood & Warley	3–3	Ilford
50	Deal Town	1–3	Sittingbourne
51	Bangor City	2–1	South Liverpool
52	Lancing Athletic	0–1	Southwick
54	Darwen	2–0	Stalybridge Celtic
57	Linby Colliery	1–0	Sutton Town
58	Carshalton Athletic	2–3	Sutton United
59	Bideford	8–2	Taunton

=== 2nd replay ===
Tie	Home team	Score	Away team
33	Ilford	2–3	Brentwood & Warley

== 1st qualifying round ==
=== Ties ===
Tie	Home team	Score	Away team
1	Alford United	1–3	Skegness Town
2	Alnwick Town	5–0	Cramlington Welfare
3	Amble	3–4	Shankhouse
4	Aylesbury United	4–1	Marlow
5	Banbury Spencer	2–1	Huntley & Palmers
6	Basingstoke Town	4–3	Cowes
7	Bedford Town	3–2	Biggleswade & District
8	Betteshanger Colliery Welfare	3–1	Gravesend & Northfleet
9	Bexhill Town	0–4	Tonbridge
10	Billingham Synthonia	6–0	Skinnigrove Works
11	Blackhall Colliery Welfare	2–1	Ushaw Moor
12	Blandford United	1–3	Lymington
13	Boldon Colliery Welfare	3–5	Consett
14	Bootle Athletic	1–1	Bangor City
15	Boots Athletic	2–2	Basford United
16	Boston United	5–3	Barton Town
17	Bourne Town	2–4	Retford Town
18	Bridport	2–2	Bournemouth Gasworks Athletic
19	Brunswick Institute	0–2	Norton Woodseats
20	Burscough	2–2	Morecambe
21	Cheshunt	1–2	Leyton
22	Chilton Athletic	4–2	Eppleton Colliery Welfare
23	Cinderford Town	1–5	Ebbw Vale
24	Clacton Town	0–1	Briggs Sports
25	Clandown	3–1	Paulton Rovers
26	Corsham Town	2–7	Frome Town
27	Cradley Heath	1–5	Brierley Hill Alliance
28	Darlaston	1–2	Bedworth Town
29	Dartmouth United	1–0	Newquay
30	Dawdon Colliery Welfare	3–0	Annfield Plain
31	Diss Town	0–4	Sudbury Town
32	Dover	4–0	Ramsgate Athletic
33	Ellesmere Port Town	2–2	Flint Town United
34	Enfield	0–2	Woodford Town
35	Eton Manor	1–0	Clapton
36	Evenwood Town	1–3	Crook Town
37	Ferryhill Athletic	3–4	South Bank
38	Finchley	2–1	Tufnell Park Edmonton
39	Fleetwood	5–0	Great Harwood
40	Folkestone	3–1	Margate
41	Frickley Colliery	3–1	Hallam
42	Glastonbury	2–2	Bath City
43	Goole Town	7–3	Harrogate Town
44	Gorleston	5–1	Beccles
45	Gosforth & Coxlodge	2–3	Easington Colliery Welfare
46	Gosport Borough Athletic	2–3	Newport I O W
47	Grays Athletic	1–2	Brentwood & Warley
48	Great Yarmouth Town	4–2	Bungay Town
49	Harwich & Parkeston	2–2	Dagenham
50	Hayes	5–0	Berkhamsted Town
51	Haywards Heath	1–2	Eastbourne
52	Head Wrightsons	2–3	Bridlington Trinity
53	Headington United	5–2	Chesham United
54	Hednesford Town	0–0	Tamworth
55	Hinckley Athletic	1–1	Barwell Athletic
56	Hitchin Town	1–7	Eynesbury Rovers
57	Holbeach United	5–0	Lysaghts Sports
58	Horden Colliery Welfare	9–1	Seaham Colliery Welfare
59	Huntingdon United	0–2	Wisbech Town
60	Ilkeston Town	7–3	Gedling Colliery
61	Ilminster Town	1–1	Bridgwater Town
62	Kidderminster Harriers	3–2	Stafford Rangers
63	King's Lynn	14–1	Chatteris Town
64	Kingstonian	3–1	Tooting & Mitcham United
65	Lancaster City	2–0	Bacup Borough
66	Langold W M C	3–2	Brodsworth Main Colliery
67	Llanelli	2–0	Lovells Athletic
68	Long Eaton Town	1–1	Gresley Rovers
69	Lytham	1–3	Darwen
70	Macclesfield	0–0	Buxton
71	March Town United	1–1	Cambridge United
72	Moira United	5–1	Ibstock Penistone Rovers
73	Mossley	3–0	Leyland Motors
74	Murton Colliery Welfare	3–2	Silksworth Colliery Welfare
75	Nantwich	2–2	Congleton Town
76	Netherfield	2–0	Clitheroe
77	Newburn	1–1	Blyth Spartans
78	Newhall United	4–0	Matlock Town
79	Northwich Victoria	6–2	Linotype & Machinery
80	Nuneaton Borough	2–2	Burton Albion
81	Ossett Town w/o-scr Bradford United		
82	Parliament Street Methodists	2–3	Linby Colliery
83	Portland United	1–1	Dorchester Town
84	Raleigh Athletic	2–4	Creswell Colliery
85	Ransome & Marles	4–1	Players Athletic
86	Rawmarsh Welfare	2–0	Beighton Miners Welfare
87	Redhill	2–3	Ashford Town (Kent)
88	Romford	1–0	Barking
89	Rossendale United	4–2	Horwich R M I
90	Runcorn	2–1	Marine
91	Rushden Town	0–6	Corby Town
92	Salisbury	2–0	Calne & Harris United
93	Selby Town	1–1	Farsley Celtic
94	Shaftesbury	1–4	Poole Town
95	Sheringham	0–2	Gothic
96	Shildon	3–0	Stanley United
97	Shirebrook	5–1	Cinderhill Colliery
98	Skelmersdale United	5–1	Ashton United
99	Slough Town	2–2	Barnet
100	Snowdown Colliery Welfare	4–2	Sittingbourne
101	South Kirkby Colliery	4–0	Grimethorpe Athletic
102	South Normanton Miners Welfare	6–0	Coalville Town
103	South Shields	4–0	Heaton Stannington
104	Southwick	6–7	Worthing
105	Spalding United	1–7	Kettering Town
106	St Albans City	3–1	Maidenhead United
107	St Austell	1–1	Bideford
108	St Helens Town	2–2	Prescot Cables
109	St Neots & District	6–3	Histon Institute
110	Stamford	5–3	Wellingborough Town
111	Stocksbridge Works	1–1	Denaby United
112	Stonehouse	1–2	Gloucester City
113	Stourbridge	4–0	Oswestry Town
114	Stowmarket	0–3	Bury Town
115	Street	0–3	Chippenham United
116	Sutton Town (Birmingham)	2–0	Boldmere St Michaels
117	Sutton United	2–2	Erith & Belvedere
118	Symingtons Recreation	1–3	Desborough Town
119	Thetford Town	4–4	Lowestoft Town
120	Totton	3–0	Ryde Sports
121	Troedyrhiw	1–3	Barry Town
122	Trowbridge Town	2–2	Chippenham Town
123	Truro City	2–3	Barnstaple Town
124	Upton Colliery	3–3	Sheffield
125	Vauxhall Motors	0–0	Potton United
126	Walton & Hersham	0–6	Hounslow Town
127	Wealdstone	2–1	Uxbridge
128	Wells City	2–2	Peasedown Miners Welfare
129	Welton Rovers	2–2	Westbury United
130	West Auckland Town	2–4	Spennymoor United
131	West Sleekburn Welfare	2–2	Hexham Hearts
132	Whitby Town	6–2	Bridlington Central United
133	Whitton United	4–1	Leiston
134	Whitwick Colliery	0–3	Brush Sports
135	Willington	4–4	Tow Law Town
136	Winchester City	2–2	Alton Town
137	Winsford United	2–0	Altrincham
138	Woking	5–1	Dorking
139	Wolverton Town & B R	6–1	Luton Amateur
140	Worcester City	3–4	Wellington Town
141	Worksop Town	5–1	Bentley Colliery
142	Wycombe Wanderers	6–1	Windsor & Eton
143	Wymondham Town	1–4	Cromer
144	Yorkshire Amateur	5–2	Pilkington Recreation

=== Replays ===
Tie	Home team	Score	Away team
14	Bangor City	2–0	Bootle Athletic
15	Basford United	2–0	Boots Athletic
18	Bournemouth Gasworks Athletic	3–1	Bridport
20	Morecambe	0–1	Burscough
33	Flint Town United	3–1	Ellesmere Port Town
42	Bath City	3–1	Glastonbury
49	Dagenham	2–1	Harwich & Parkeston
54	Tamworth	2–4	Hednesford Town
55	Barwell Athletic	2–7	Hinckley Athletic
61	Bridgwater Town	4–2	Ilminster Town
68	Gresley Rovers	0–2	Long Eaton Town
70	Buxton	2–0	Macclesfield
71	Cambridge United	3–4	March Town United
75	Congleton Town	3–1	Nantwich
77	Blyth Spartans	1–0	Newburn
80	Burton Albion	2–4	Nuneaton Borough
83	Dorchester Town	2–3	Portland United
93	Farsley Celtic	4–2	Selby Town
99	Barnet	1–6	Slough Town
107	Bideford	5–0	St Austell
108	Prescot Cables	2–1	St Helens Town
111	Denaby United	2–1	Stocksbridge Works
117	Erith & Belvedere	1–1	Sutton United
119	Lowestoft Town	5–0	Thetford Town
122	Chippenham Town	2–1	Trowbridge Town
124	Sheffield	0–2	Upton Colliery
125	Potton United	4–3	Vauxhall Motors
128	Peasedown Miners Welfare	0–2	Wells City
129	Westbury United	0–3	Welton Rovers
131	Hexham Hearts	6–0	West Sleekburn Welfare
135	Tow Law Town	1–2	Willington
136	Alton Town	3–1	Winchester City

=== 2nd replay ===
Tie	Home team	Score	Away team
117	Sutton United	3–0	Erith & Belvedere

== 2nd qualifying round ==
=== Ties ===
Tie	Home team	Score	Away team
1	Alnwick Town	2–0	Shankhouse
2	Banbury Spencer	0–4	Aylesbury United
3	Bangor City	1–0	Runcorn
4	Barry Town	0–0	Llanelli
5	Basford United	1–1	Newhall United
6	Basingstoke Town	2–5	Alton Town
7	Bedford Town	3–0	Eynesbury Rovers
8	Bedworth Town	3–0	Hednesford Town
9	Bideford	7–0	Dartmouth United
10	Blyth Spartans	4–0	Hexham Hearts
11	Boston United	6–1	Retford Town
12	Bournemouth Gasworks Athletic	1–3	Portland United
13	Brentwood & Warley	3–3	Dagenham
14	Bridgwater Town	1–3	Barnstaple Town
15	Bridlington Trinity	0–6	Billingham Synthonia
16	Brierley Hill Alliance	1–2	Kidderminster Harriers
17	Briggs Sports	1–1	Romford
18	Brush Sports	2–0	Moira United
19	Bury Town	2–0	Lowestoft Town
20	Buxton	4–0	Winsford United
21	Chilton Athletic	0–0	Blackhall Colliery Welfare
22	Chippenham Town	5–1	Welton Rovers
23	Clandown	1–3	Bath City
24	Congleton Town	1–0	Northwich Victoria
25	Corby Town	1–2	Kettering Town
26	Crook Town	2–1	Willington
27	Darwen	1–0	Mossley
28	Dawdon Colliery Welfare	0–3	Consett
29	Desborough Town	2–1	Stamford
30	Dover	0–2	Folkestone
31	Eastbourne	2–2	Ashford Town (Kent)
32	Eton Manor	0–1	Leyton
33	Farsley Celtic	2–3	Yorkshire Amateur
34	Frickley Colliery	4–1	Denaby United
35	Frome Town	2–3	Salisbury
36	Gloucester City	1–2	Ebbw Vale
37	Gorleston	3–0	Cromer
38	Great Yarmouth Town	0–3	Gothic
39	Headington United	3–2	Wycombe Wanderers (tie awarded to Wycombe Wanderers)
40	Hinckley Athletic	2–2	South Normanton Miners Welfare
41	King's Lynn	2–0	Wisbech Town
42	Lancaster City	2–3	Fleetwood
43	Linby Colliery	5–1	Ransome & Marles
44	Long Eaton Town	0–3	Ilkeston Town
45	Lymington	3–2	Poole Town
46	March Town United	1–0	St Neots & District
47	Murton Colliery Welfare	0–3	Horden Colliery Welfare
48	Netherfield	4–2	Burscough
49	Newport I O W	6–1	Totton
50	Nuneaton Borough	5–1	Sutton Town (Birmingham)
51	Ossett Town	2–3	Goole Town
52	Potton United	2–5	Wolverton Town & B R
53	Prescot Cables	3–1	Flint Town United
54	Rawmarsh Welfare	2–0	Langold W M C
55	Rossendale United	1–1	Skelmersdale United
56	Shildon	0–2	Spennymoor United
57	Shirebrook	2–2	Creswell Colliery
58	Skegness Town	4–0	Holbeach United
59	Snowdown Colliery Welfare	0–2	Betteshanger Colliery Welfare
60	South Shields	2–2	Easington Colliery Welfare
61	St Albans City	1–1	Slough Town
62	Stourbridge	1–3	Wellington Town
63	Sutton United	2–2	Kingstonian
64	Tonbridge	11–1	Worthing
65	Upton Colliery	2–2	South Kirkby Colliery
66	Wealdstone	2–0	Hayes
67	Wells City	1–5	Chippenham United
68	Whitby Town	3–2	South Bank
69	Whitton United	1–2	Sudbury Town
70	Woking	0–6	Hounslow Town
71	Woodford Town	3–1	Finchley
72	Worksop Town	1–0	Norton Woodseats

=== Replays ===
Tie	Home team	Score	Away team
4	Llanelli	2–2	Barry Town
5	Newhall United	3–0	Basford United
13	Dagenham	1–2	Brentwood & Warley
17	Romford	6–2	Briggs Sports
21	Blackhall Colliery Welfare	1–0	Chilton Athletic
31	Ashford Town (Kent)	4–0	Eastbourne
40	South Normanton Miners Welfare	1–2	Hinckley Athletic
55	Skelmersdale United	3–0	Rossendale United
57	Creswell Colliery	1–0	Shirebrook
60	Easington Colliery Welfare	1–1	South Shields
61	Slough Town	4–0	St Albans City
63	Kingstonian	2–3	Sutton United
65	South Kirkby Colliery	2–3	Upton Colliery

=== 2nd replays ===
Tie	Home team	Score	Away team
4	Barry Town	4–0	Llanelli
60	South Shields	2–1	Easington Colliery Welfare

== 3rd qualifying round ==
=== Ties ===
Tie	Home team	Score	Away team
1	Ashford Town (Kent)	1–1	Tonbridge
2	Bangor City	1–0	Prescot Cables
3	Barnstaple Town	2–1	Bideford
4	Barry Town	4–2	Ebbw Vale
5	Bedford Town	5–1	Wolverton Town & B R
6	Bedworth Town	1–1	Nuneaton Borough
7	Blackhall Colliery Welfare	3–1	Horden Colliery Welfare
8	Blyth Spartans	4–3	Alnwick Town
9	Bury Town	1–1	Sudbury Town
10	Buxton	2–0	Congleton Town
11	Chippenham United	0–3	Bath City
12	Consett	4–0	South Shields
13	Creswell Colliery	2–0	Linby Colliery
14	Crook Town	0–2	Spennymoor United
15	Fleetwood	3–0	Netherfield
16	Folkestone	2–0	Betteshanger Colliery Welfare
17	Frickley Colliery	5–0	Upton Colliery
18	Goole Town	3–0	Yorkshire Amateur
19	Gorleston	5–0	Gothic
20	Hinckley Athletic	2–3	Brush Sports
21	Hounslow Town	1–4	Sutton United
22	Ilkeston Town	6–1	Newhall United
23	Kettering Town	2–0	Desborough Town
24	Leyton	3–2	Woodford Town
25	Lymington	1–1	Portland United
26	March Town United	1–4	King's Lynn
27	Newport I O W	5–1	Alton Town
28	Rawmarsh Welfare	2–1	Worksop Town
29	Romford	3–1	Brentwood & Warley
30	Salisbury	1–1	Chippenham Town
31	Skegness Town	2–1	Boston United
32	Skelmersdale United	1–1	Darwen
33	Wealdstone	5–0	Slough Town
34	Wellington Town	3–2	Kidderminster Harriers
35	Whitby Town	2–3	Billingham Synthonia
36	Wycombe Wanderers	1–2	Aylesbury United

=== Replays ===
Tie	Home team	Score	Away team
1	Tonbridge	4–0	Ashford Town (Kent)
6	Nuneaton Borough	1–2	Bedworth Town
9	Sudbury Town	2–2	Bury Town
25	Portland United	1–2	Lymington
30	Chippenham Town	2–1	Salisbury
32	Darwen	0–1	Skelmersdale United

=== 2nd replay ===
Tie	Home team	Score	Away team
9	Bury Town	2–4	Sudbury Town

== 4th qualifying round ==
The teams that given byes to this round are New Brighton, Yeovil Town, Leytonstone, Cheltenham Town, Guildford City, Chelmsford City, Gainsborough Trinity, Stockton, Walthamstow Avenue, Dartford, Witton Albion, Weymouth, North Shields, Rhyl, Bromsgrove Rovers, Merthyr Tydfil, Hereford United, Grantham, Peterborough United, Scarborough, Ashington, Wigan Athletic, Nelson and Hendon.

=== Ties ===
Tie	Home team	Score	Away team
1	Ashington	0–2	Blyth Spartans
2	Aylesbury United	4–3	Hendon
3	Bangor City	2–1	New Brighton
4	Bath City	0–2	Barry Town
5	Billingham Synthonia	2–1	North Shields
6	Bromsgrove Rovers	2–5	Bedford Town
7	Brush Sports	3–1	Wellington Town
8	Cheltenham Town	2–3	Merthyr Tydfil
9	Chippenham Town	3–1	Newport I O W
10	Folkestone	1–1	Sutton United
11	Frickley Colliery	1–1	Buxton
12	Gainsborough Trinity	5–2	Creswell Colliery
13	Goole Town	4–3	Spennymoor United
14	Gorleston	1–0	Romford
15	Guildford City	2–1	Dartford
16	Ilkeston Town	2–1	Grantham
17	Kettering Town	4–2	Bedworth Town
18	King's Lynn	1–0	Sudbury Town
19	Leyton	0–0	Walthamstow Avenue
20	Leytonstone	2–1	Chelmsford City
21	Lymington	1–1	Barnstaple Town
22	Peterborough United	1–1	Hereford United
23	Rawmarsh Welfare	4–2	Skegness Town
24	Rhyl	7–2	Fleetwood
25	Scarborough	0–0	Blackhall Colliery Welfare
26	Skelmersdale United	0–3	Nelson
27	Stockton	2–0	Consett
28	Tonbridge	2–0	Wealdstone
29	Wigan Athletic	2–2	Witton Albion
30	Yeovil Town	1–1	Weymouth

=== Replays ===
Tie	Home team	Score	Away team
10	Sutton United	1–3	Folkestone
11	Buxton	3–1	Frickley Colliery
19	Walthamstow Avenue	1–2	Leyton
21	Barnstaple Town	3–1	Lymington
22	Hereford United	1–0	Peterborough United
25	Blackhall Colliery Welfare	5–3	Scarborough
29	Witton Albion	3–3	Wigan Athletic
30	Weymouth	2–1	Yeovil Town

=== 2nd replay ===
Tie	Home team	Score	Away team
29	Wigan Athletic	1–3	Witton Albion

== 1951–52 FA Cup ==
See 1951–52 FA Cup for details of the rounds from the first round proper onwards.
