= 1985–86 FA Trophy =

1985-86 FA Trophy
FA Challenge Trophy

Tournament details
- Country: England; Wales
- Teams: 211

Final positions
- Champions: Altrincham
- Runners-up: Runcorn

The 1985–86 FA Trophy was the seventeenth season of the FA Trophy.

== Preliminary round ==
=== Ties ===
Tie	Home team	Score	Away team
1	Bristol Manor Farm	0-0	Llanelli
2	Caernarfon Town	1-0	Leicester United
3	Chard Town	1-0	Minehead
4	Chatham Town	2-0	Thanet United
5	Chesham United	1-1	Finchley
6	Clapton	1-1	Leyton Wingate
7	Curzon Ashton	2-0	Penrith
8	Grays Athletic	2-2	Witney Town
9	Hednesford Town	0-0	Redditch United
10	Ilkeston Town	1-1	V S Rugby
11	Lancaster City	0-0	Accrington Stanley
12	Leyland Motors	3-1	Glossop
13	Maesteg Park	1-0	Weston Super Mare
14	Maidenhead United	3-0	Walton & Hersham
15	Saltash United	3-0	Poole Town
16	Sheppey United	1-1	Metropolitan Police
17	Spalding United	0-0	Leek Town
18	St Albans City	1-2	Oxford City
19	Tilbury	3-1	Wembley

=== Replays ===
Tie	Home team	Score	Away team
1	Llanelli	3-1	Bristol Manor Farm
5	Finchley	3-1	Chesham United
6	Leyton Wingate	5-0	Clapton
8	Witney Town	3-4	Grays Athletic
9	Redditch United	2-4	Hednesford Town
10	V S Rugby	10-0	Ilkeston Town
11	Accrington Stanley	4-4	Lancaster City
16	Metropolitan Police	2-3	Sheppey United
17	Leek Town	3-0	Spalding United

=== 2nd replay ===
Tie	Home team	Score	Away team
11	Accrington Stanley	2-2	Lancaster City

=== 3rd replay ===
Tie	Home team	Score	Away team
11	Lancaster City	4-2	Accrington Stanley

== First qualifying round ==
=== Ties ===
Tie	Home team	Score	Away team
1	Alvechurch	1-4	Worksop Town
2	Arnold	0-1	Mossley
3	Ashford Town (Kent)	0-0	Bromley
4	Aylesbury United	3-1	Wellingborough Town
5	Banbury United	3-2	Burnham & Hillingdon
6	Barry Town	3-2	Frome Town
7	Basildon United	2-2	Harlow Town
8	Basingstoke Town	1-0	Tooting & Mitcham United
9	Bideford	2-1	Trowbridge Town
10	Billericay Town	5-1	Walthamstow Avenue
11	Billingham Synthonia	3-0	Curzon Ashton
12	Billingham Town	1-1	Morecambe
13	Bognor Regis Town	3-0	Tonbridge
14	Bootle	4-4	Shepshed Charterhouse
15	Brandon United	9-1	Horwich R M I
16	Bridgend Town	4-1	Barnstaple Town
17	Buxton	4-1	Sutton Town
18	Cambridge City	2-2	Bedworth United
19	Chester-Le-Street Town	3-0	Peterlee Newtown
20	Clandown	0-2	Mangotsfield United
21	Colwyn Bay	1-1	Belper Town
22	Congleton Town	0-2	Tow Law Town
23	Consett	0-3	Bridlington Trinity
24	Crook Town	1-2	Goole Town
25	Dover Athletic	0-3	Fareham Town
26	Dudley Town	3-0	Heanor Town
27	Eastwood Town	1-1	Radcliffe Borough
28	Epsom & Ewell	5-1	Kingstonian
29	Farnborough Town	3-0	Gosport Borough
30	Finchley	1-3	Leyton Wingate
31	Folkestone	0-1	Lewes
32	Formby	3-2	Ferryhill Athletic
33	Gravesend & Northfleet	1-2	Sheppey United
34	Grays Athletic	0-0	Hampton
35	Gretna	4-1	Lancaster City
36	Hayes	1-3	Uxbridge
37	Hertford Town	2-5	Corby Town
38	Hitchin Town	1-2	Dunstable
39	Leatherhead w/o-scr Hastings United		
40	Leyland Motors	7-0	Horden Colliery Welfare
41	Llanelli	1-1	Dorchester Town
42	Melksham Town	3-2	Chard Town
43	Oldbury United	2-4	Caernarfon Town
44	Oswestry Town	0-3	Gainsborough Trinity
45	Oxford City	2-1	Aveley
46	Prescot Cables	1-1	Shildon
47	R S Southampton	3-0	Andover
48	Ryhope Community Association	6-1	Netherfield
49	Salisbury	4-1	Maesteg Park
50	Saltash United	3-1	Forest Green Rovers
51	Sittingbourne	4-0	Chatham Town
52	South Liverpool	0-1	Alfreton Town
53	Southport	2-1	Burscough
54	Staines Town	2-0	Boreham Wood
55	Stalybridge Celtic	4-0	Moor Green
56	Stourbridge	1-2	Hednesford Town
57	Sutton Coldfield Town	0-0	Leek Town
58	Tilbury	1-0	Hornchurch
59	Ton Pentre	0-3	Taunton Town
60	V S Rugby	5-2	Winsford United
61	Waterlooville	3-1	Canterbury City
62	Whitley Bay	1-0	Bedlington Terriers
63	Woking	4-5	Maidenhead United
64	Workington	2-1	Denaby United

=== Replays ===
Tie	Home team	Score	Away team
3	Bromley	3-0	Ashford Town (Kent)
7	Harlow Town	0-1	Basildon United
12	Morecambe	2-0	Billingham Town
14	Shepshed Charterhouse	3-1	Bootle
18	Bedworth United	2-1	Cambridge City
21	Belper Town	3-2	Colwyn Bay
27	Radcliffe Borough	5-1	Eastwood Town
34	Hampton	0-1	Grays Athletic
41	Dorchester Town	2-1	Llanelli
46	Shildon	2-1	Prescot Cables
57	Leek Town	2-1	Sutton Coldfield Town

== Second qualifying round ==
=== Ties ===
Tie	Home team	Score	Away team
1	Aylesbury United	0-2	Bedworth United
2	Basildon United	0-0	V S Rugby
3	Billericay Town	2-0	Banbury United
4	Billingham Synthonia	0-2	Morecambe
5	Caernarfon Town	0-2	Dudley Town
6	Corby Town	6-1	Oxford City
7	Dorchester Town	4-1	Barry Town
8	Epsom & Ewell	3-0	Basingstoke Town
9	Fareham Town	1-1	Waterlooville
10	Farnborough Town	4-1	Leatherhead
11	Formby	1-1	Gretna
12	Gainsborough Trinity	1-1	Shepshed Charterhouse
13	Goole Town	0-1	Leyland Motors
14	Grays Athletic	6-2	Dunstable
15	Leek Town	3-2	Buxton
16	Lewes	1-2	Bromley
17	Maidenhead United	1-2	Bognor Regis Town
18	Mangotsfield United	1-1	Taunton Town
19	Melksham Town	1-3	Saltash United
20	Mossley	3-0	Shildon
21	R S Southampton	1-1	Bridgend Town
22	Radcliffe Borough	2-0	Belper Town
23	Ryhope Community Association	3-1	Bridlington Trinity
24	Salisbury	2-0	Bideford
25	Sheppey United	2-1	Sittingbourne
26	Stalybridge Celtic	2-1	Hednesford Town
27	Tilbury	3-1	Leyton Wingate
28	Tow Law Town	1-3	Southport
29	Uxbridge	3-1	Staines Town
30	Whitley Bay	3-1	Chester-Le-Street Town
31	Workington	5-4	Brandon United
32	Worksop Town	2-3	Alfreton Town

=== Replays ===
Tie	Home team	Score	Away team
2	V S Rugby	4-0	Basildon United
9	Waterlooville	3-2	Fareham Town
11	Gretna	3-0	Formby
12	Shepshed Charterhouse	5-1	Gainsborough Trinity
18	Taunton Town	2-1	Mangotsfield United
21	Bridgend Town	3-0	R S Southampton

== Third qualifying round ==
=== Ties ===
Tie	Home team	Score	Away team
1	Barrow	0-0	Mossley
2	Bedworth United	1-1	Alfreton Town
3	Billericay Town	2-4	Sheppey United
4	Bishop's Stortford	2-1	Croydon
5	Bridgend Town	6-1	Taunton Town
6	Burton Albion	3-0	Grantham
7	Chelmsford City	3-0	Bognor Regis Town
8	Chorley	0-2	Blyth Spartans
9	Corby Town	1-0	Witton Albion
10	Dorchester Town	3-5	Weymouth
11	Epsom & Ewell	2-2	Grays Athletic
12	Farnborough Town	0-3	Crawley Town
13	Gloucester City	0-4	Worcester City
14	Hendon	0-1	Wokingham Town
15	Leamington	1-2	Rhyl
16	Leek Town	2-1	Dudley Town
17	Leyland Motors	1-3	Whitby Town
18	Merthyr Tydfil	1-1	Salisbury
19	Morecambe	1-1	Gretna
20	North Shields	1-1	Workington
21	Radcliffe Borough	2-2	Willenhall Town
22	Ryhope Community Association	2-1	Spennymoor United
23	Shepshed Charterhouse	2-1	Matlock Town
24	Slough Town	1-0	Bromley
25	Southport	2-0	Gateshead
26	Stalybridge Celtic	1-3	Hyde United
27	Uxbridge	2-0	Barking
28	V S Rugby	0-1	Tilbury
29	Waterlooville	4-3	Carshalton Athletic
30	Whitley Bay	0-3	South Bank
31	Windsor & Eton	5-0	Leytonstone Ilford
32	Yeovil Town	1-2	Saltash United

=== Replays ===
Tie	Home team	Score	Away team
1	Mossley	2-4	Barrow
2	Alfreton Town	2-3	Bedworth United
11	Grays Athletic	3-2	Epsom & Ewell
18	Salisbury	2-1	Merthyr Tydfil
19	Gretna	1-2	Morecambe
20	Workington	2-0	North Shields
21	Willenhall Town	3-1	Radcliffe Borough

== 1st round ==
=== Ties ===
Tie	Home team	Score	Away team
1	Bangor City	1-0	Willenhall Town
2	Barnet	0-1	Wycombe Wanderers
3	Bedworth United	1-1	Frickley Athletic
4	Bishop Auckland	2-0	Blyth Spartans
5	Bishop's Stortford	2-0	Wokingham Town
6	Bridgend Town	2-2	Harrow Borough
7	Bromsgrove Rovers	1-1	Shepshed Charterhouse
8	Chelmsford City	2-1	Bath City
9	Cheltenham Town	3-0	Fisher Athletic
10	Crawley Town	5-2	Worcester City
11	Dagenham	3-0	Sheppey United
12	Dulwich Hamlet	1-1	Windsor & Eton
13	Enfield	3-0	Waterlooville
14	Grays Athletic	2-1	Uxbridge
15	Hyde United	0-2	Corby Town
16	Kidderminster Harriers	5-2	Boston United
17	King's Lynn	1-1	Macclesfield Town
18	Maidstone United	3-0	Weymouth
19	Morecambe	0-2	Burton Albion
20	Northwich Victoria	1-0	Workington
	Rhyl	1-1	Leek Town
22	Runcorn	2-0	Marine
23	Ryhope Community Association	1-3	Altrincham
24	Saltash United	1-2	Dartford
25	Scarborough	2-1	Barrow
26	Slough Town	1-0	Tilbury
27	South Bank	1-1	Whitby Town
28	Stafford Rangers	1-0	Nuneaton Borough
29	Sutton United	0-1	Kettering Town
30	Telford United	2-4	Southport
31	Wealdstone	1-0	Welling United
32	Worthing	1-0	Salisbury

=== Replays ===
Tie	Home team	Score	Away team
3	Frickley Athletic	5-0	Bedworth United
6	Harrow Borough	1-2	Bridgend Town
7	Shepshed Charterhouse	1-4	Bromsgrove Rovers
12	Windsor & Eton	2-1	Dulwich Hamlet
17	Macclesfield Town	3-0	King's Lynn
21	Leek Town	3-2	Rhyl
27	Whitby Town	1-2	South Bank

== 2nd round ==
=== Ties ===
Tie	Home team	Score	Away team
1	Altrincham	6-1	Bangor City
2	Bishop's Stortford	2-0	Northwich Victoria
3	Burton Albion	1-0	Bromsgrove Rovers
4	Corby Town	0-4	Kidderminster Harriers
5	Crawley Town	0-2	Wycombe Wanderers
6	Dagenham	0-1	Cheltenham Town
7	Dartford	1-3	South Bank
8	Enfield	3-2	Maidstone United
9	Grays Athletic	1-1	Chelmsford City
10	Leek Town	2-1	Macclesfield Town
11	Scarborough	0-0	Southport
12	Slough Town	1-2	Kettering Town
13	Stafford Rangers	0-1	Bishop Auckland
14	Wealdstone	2-1	Frickley Athletic
15	Windsor & Eton	0-1	Runcorn
16	Worthing	1-0	Bridgend Town

=== Replays ===
Tie	Home team	Score	Away team
9	Chelmsford City	3-1	Grays Athletic
11	Southport	1-1	Scarborough

=== 2nd replay ===
Tie	Home team	Score	Away team
11	Southport	1-0	Scarborough

== 3rd round ==
=== Ties ===
Tie	Home team	Score	Away team
1	Altrincham	1-0	Bishop Auckland
2	Cheltenham Town	0-0	Bishop's Stortford
3	Enfield	5-3	Chelmsford City
4	Runcorn	2-0	Burton Albion
5	Southport	1-1	Kidderminster Harriers
6	Wealdstone	0-0	South Bank
7	Worthing	0-0	Kettering Town
8	Wycombe Wanderers	2-2	Leek Town

=== Replays ===
Tie	Home team	Score	Away team
2	Bishop's Stortford	1-3	Cheltenham Town
5	Kidderminster Harriers	6-1	Southport
6	South Bank	2-1	Wealdstone
7	Kettering Town	2-1	Worthing
8	Leek Town	5-5	Wycombe Wanderers

=== 2nd replay ===
Tie	Home team	Score	Away team
8	Wycombe Wanderers	1-1	Leek Town

=== 3rd replay ===
Tie	Home team	Score	Away team
8	Wycombe Wanderers	1-0	Leek Town

== 4th round ==
=== Ties ===
Tie	Home team	Score	Away team
1	Cheltenham Town	0-2	Altrincham
2	Kettering Town	2-1	Wycombe Wanderers
3	Kidderminster Harriers	1-2	Runcorn
4	South Bank	0-2	Enfield

== Semi finals ==
=== First leg ===
Tie	Home team	Score	Away team
1	Enfield	1-1	Altrincham
2	Runcorn	0-0	Kettering

=== Second leg ===
Tie	Home team	Score	Away team	Aggregate
1	Altrincham	2-0	Enfield	
2	Kettering Town	0-2	Runcorn	

== Final ==
=== Tie ===
Home team	Score	Away team
Altrincham	1-0	Runcorn
