= 1955–56 FA Cup qualifying rounds =

Tournament details
- Country: England; Wales

The FA Cup 1955–56 is the 75th season of the world's oldest football knockout competition; The Football Association Challenge Cup, or FA Cup for short. The large number of clubs entering the tournament from lower down the English football league system meant that the competition started with a number of preliminary and qualifying rounds. The 30 victorious teams from the fourth round qualifying progressed to the first round proper.

== Preliminary round ==
=== Ties ===
Tie	Home team	Score	Away team
1	Ashford Town (Kent)	1–0	Tooting & Mitcham United
2	Atherstone Town	1–2	Burton Albion
3	Aveley	5–1	Brentwood & Warley
4	Aylesbury United	3–1	Slough Centre
5	Bangor City	3–3	Llandudno
6	Barking	2–2	Leyton
7	Berkhamsted Town	2–2	Kingstonian
8	Bexhill Town	2–3	Littlehampton Town
9	Bilston	1–5	Stafford Rangers
10	Bishop's Stortford	1–2	Eton Manor
11	Bodmin Town	4–3	Ilfracombe Town
12	Boldmere St Michaels	2–2	Sutton Town (Birmingham)
13	Brierley Hill Alliance	1–1	Kidderminster Harriers
14	Bromley	0–1	Margate
15	Bulford United	1–1	Welton Rovers
16	Cambridge City	2–2	March Town United
17	Canterbury City	2–1	Sutton United
18	Carshalton Athletic	4–1	Dulwich Hamlet
19	Chatham Town	1–6	Ramsgate Athletic
20	Chatteris Town	2–1	Cambridge United
21	Chorley	4–0	Darwen
22	Clandown	0–0	Bath City
23	Clevedon	0–2	Chippenham United
24	Dagenham	2–1	Romford
25	Dartford	0–3	Gravesend & Northfleet
26	Dover	5–1	Whitstable
27	Dudley Town	1–4	Hednesford Town
28	East Grinstead	2–1	Newhaven
29	Eastbourne	4–2	Wigmore Athletic
30	Enfield	3–1	Letchworth Town
31	Erith & Belvedere	3–3	Dorking
32	Exning United	2–4	Ely City
33	Frome Town	4–3	Trowbridge Town
34	Grays Athletic	1–0	Chelmsford City
35	Halesowen Town	2–1	Bromsgrove Rovers
36	Harrow Town	3–3	Uxbridge
37	Hayes	1–4	Finchley
38	Hertford Town	1–2	St Albans City
39	Holbeach United	6–0	Newmarket Town
40	Horsham	1–3	Redhill
41	Horwich R M I	3–2	Skelmersdale United
42	Hounslow Town	3–3	Metropolitan Police
43	Ilford	0–3	Briggs Sports
44	King's Lynn	6–1	Histon
45	Leyland Motors	2–1	Bacup Borough
46	Leytonstone	2–1	Harwich & Parkeston
47	Linotype & Machinery	2–4	Hyde United
48	Maidstone United	1–1	Sheppey United
49	Marlow	1–2	Maidenhead United
50	Moor Green	2–2	Bloxwich Strollers
51	Mossley	1–1	Lytham
52	Nantwich	0–1	Congleton Town
53	Northwich Victoria	2–2	Altrincham
54	Penzance	4–2	Newquay
55	Prescot Cables	4–3	Marine
56	Rainham Town	1–3	Clacton Town
57	Redditch	0–1	Worcester City
58	Shoreham	1–6	Bognor Regis Town
59	Sittingbourne	4–2	Bexleyheath & Welling
60	Slough Town	4–0	Bicester Town
61	Snowdown Colliery Welfare	4–0	Walton & Hersham
62	South Liverpool	4–2	Ellesmere Port Town
63	St Austell	1–8	Truro City
64	St Blazey	3–1	Tavistock
65	St Helens Town	1–1	Pwllheli & District
66	Stevenage Town	1–3	Barnet
67	Stourbridge	6–0	Oswestry Town
68	Taunton	2–1	Barnstaple Town
69	Tonbridge	8–2	Betteshanger Colliery Welfare
70	Ware	7–2	Shefford Town
71	Warminster Town	3–1	Melksham Town
72	Wells City	2–1	Bridgwater Town
73	Welwyn Garden City	0–3	Clapton
74	Wembley	2–3	Wealdstone
75	Wimbledon	4–1	Edgware Town
76	Windsor & Eton	2–2	Chesham United
77	Winsford United	4–1	Witton Albion
78	Wisbech Town	5–0	Warboys Town
79	Witney Town	0–0	Wycombe Wanderers
80	Woking	1–1	Folkestone
81	Woodford Town	4–2	Tilbury
82	Worthing	5–0	Lancing Athletic
83	Yiewsley	0–0	Southall

=== Replays ===
Tie	Home team	Score	Away team
5	Llandudno	1–0	Bangor City
6	Leyton	1–0	Barking
7	Kingstonian	6–0	Berkhamsted Town
12	Sutton Town (Birmingham)	4–2	Boldmere St Michaels
13	Kidderminster Harriers	4–2	Brierley Hill Alliance
15	Welton Rovers	1–3	Bulford United
16	March Town United	3–1	Cambridge City
22	Bath City	4–0	Clandown
31	Dorking	5–1	Erith & Belvedere
36	Uxbridge	1–2	Harrow Town
42	Metropolitan Police	0–4	Hounslow Town
48	Sheppey United	0–4	Maidstone United
50	Bloxwich Strollers	0–2	Moor Green
51	Lytham	1–0	Mossley
53	Altrincham	0–2	Northwich Victoria
65	Pwllheli & District	3–1	St Helens Town
76	Chesham United	2–0	Windsor & Eton
79	Wycombe Wanderers	15–1	Witney Town
80	Folkestone	2–1	Woking
83	Southall	2–1	Yiewsley

== 1st qualifying round ==
=== Ties ===
Tie	Home team	Score	Away team
1	Abingdon Town	0–3	Slough Town
2	Andover	5–0	Gosport Borough Athletic
3	Ashford Town (Kent)	2–5	Ramsgate Athletic
4	Ashington	7–0	Gosforth & Coxlodge
5	Ashton United	1–1	Nelson
6	Banbury Spencer	7–0	Aylesbury United
7	Basingstoke Town	3–3	Fareham Town
8	Bath City	3–3	Chippenham United
9	Bedford Town	4–0	Biggleswade & District
10	Bideford	4–0	Minehead
11	Bognor Regis Town	3–1	East Grinstead
12	Bridlington Central United	3–0	North Skelton Athletic
13	Brigg Town	2–2	Bourne Town
14	Briggs Sports	0–0	Grays Athletic
15	Brodsworth Main Colliery	1–2	Langold W M C
16	Bulford United	4–1	Calne & Harris United
17	Bungay Town	0–2	Beccles
18	Burton Albion	2–0	Tamworth
19	Bury Town	3–2	Whitton United
20	Buxton	2–1	Lostock Gralam
21	Cheltenham Town	1–2	Lovells Athletic
22	Clacton Town	3–0	Woodford Town
23	Clapton	0–0	St Albans City
24	Congleton Town	1–3	Hyde United
25	Consett	4–0	Dawdon Colliery Welfare
26	Corby Town	2–1	Kettering Town
27	Cowes	4–1	Bournemouth Gasworks Athletic
28	Cromer	1–2	Wymondham Town
29	Darlaston	2–7	Stourbridge
30	Deal Town	2–2	Canterbury City
31	Denaby United	5–0	Retford Town
32	Desborough Town	0–0	Rothwell Town
33	Devizes Town	0–2	Salisbury
34	Dorking	3–1	Folkestone
35	Durham City	4–2	Chilton Athletic
36	Earlestown	1–1	South Liverpool
37	Eastbourne	0–2	Redhill
38	Ebbw Vale	2–2	Gloucester City
39	Ely City	4–3	Thetford Town
40	Epsom	3–2	Dover
41	Eton Manor	3–2	Barnet
42	Flint Town United	0–0	Runcorn
43	Frome Town	2–1	Warminster Town
44	Glastonbury	1–3	Street
45	Grantham	4–2	Ashby Institute
46	Gravesend & Northfleet	1–2	Margate
47	Harrow Town	0–7	Wealdstone
48	Hednesford Town	0–1	Halesowen Town
49	Hemel Hempstead	1–0	Hounslow Town
50	Hexham Hearts	2–4	North Shields
51	Hitchin Town	5–0	Ware
52	Hoddesdon Town	2–5	Enfield
53	Kidderminster Harriers	2–1	Wellington Town
54	King's Lynn	4–2	Chatteris Town
55	Lancaster City	2–0	Burscough
56	Langwith Miners Welfare	1–2	Hallam
57	Leyland Motors	1–0	Horwich R M I
58	Leyton	3–0	Aveley
59	Leytonstone	0–3	Dagenham
60	Llanelli	5–0	Cinderford Town
61	Lockheed Leamington	2–1	Moor Green
62	Long Eaton Town	2–3	Whitwick Colliery
63	Lowestoft Town	9–0	Haverhill Rovers
64	Lytham	1–4	Chorley
65	Macclesfield	0–4	Northwich Victoria
66	March Town United	3–1	St Neots & District
67	Milnthorpe Corinthians	5–2	Morecambe
68	Murton Colliery Welfare	4–2	Blackhall Colliery Welfare
69	New Brighton	4–0	Llandudno
70	Newburn	1–2	Cramlington Welfare
71	Norton Woodseats	1–2	Beighton Miners Welfare
72	Oxford City	2–1	Chesham United
73	Penzance	3–1	Truro City
74	Potton United	0–2	Eynesbury Rovers
75	Pwllheli & District	4–1	Prescot Cables
76	Radstock Town	2–3	Weston Super Mare
77	Ransome & Marles	6–1	Creswell Colliery
78	Rossendale United	4–3	Droylsden
79	Rugby Town	2–2	Bedworth Town
80	Seaham Colliery Welfare	1–3	Easington Colliery Welfare
81	Sheringham	0–0	Great Yarmouth Town
82	Shildon	3–0	Stockton
83	Silksworth Colliery Welfare	9–5	Annfield Plain
84	Sittingbourne	2–0	Tunbridge Wells United
85	Skegness Town	7–2	Barton Town
86	Snowdown Colliery Welfare	0–1	Carshalton Athletic
87	South Shields	5–0	Alnwick Town
88	Southall	1–1	Kingstonian
89	Southwick	2–1	Littlehampton Town
90	Stafford Rangers	1–2	Worcester City
91	Stalybridge Celtic	1–1	Winsford United
92	Stamford	1–5	Rushden Town
93	Stanley United	0–1	West Auckland Town
94	Stocksbridge Works	8–2	Sheffield
95	Stonehouse	3–4	Barry Town
96	Stowmarket	7–0	Diss Town
97	Sudbury Town	14–1	Leiston
98	Sutton Town (Birmingham)	2–2	Bourneville Athletic
99	Taunton	0–2	St Blazey
100	Tonbridge	0–1	Maidstone United
101	Tow Law Town	3–1	Evenwood Town
102	Upton Colliery	0–3	Frickley Colliery
103	Wadebridge Town	2–5	Bodmin Town
104	Wellingborough Town	1–9	Spalding United
105	Wells City	2–1	Peasedown Miners Welfare
106	Westbury United	1–1	Chippenham Town
107	Willington	3–1	Cockfield
108	Wimbledon	0–1	Finchley
109	Winchester City	2–2	Chichester City
110	Wisbech Town	2–2	Holbeach United
111	Wolverton Town & B R	0–2	Dunstable Town
112	Worksop Town	8–0	Brunswick Institute
113	Worthing	4–1	Haywards Heath
114	Wycombe Wanderers	4–2	Maidenhead United
115	Yorkshire Amateur	1–2	Ossett Town

=== Replays ===
Tie	Home team	Score	Away team
5	Nelson	1–4	Ashton United
7	Fareham Town	3–2	Basingstoke Town
8	Chippenham United	1–0	Bath City
13	Bourne Town	2–3	Brigg Town
14	Grays Athletic	0–0	Briggs Sports
23	St Albans City	4–1	Clapton
30	Canterbury City	2–1	Deal Town
32	Rothwell Town	5–0	Desborough Town
36	South Liverpool	3–1	Earlestown
38	Gloucester City	4–1	Ebbw Vale
42	Runcorn	4–3	Flint Town United
79	Bedworth Town	2–2	Rugby Town
81	Great Yarmouth Town	3–2	Sheringham
88	Kingstonian	0–1	Southall
91	Winsford United	6–0	Stalybridge Celtic
98	Bourneville Athletic	1–4	Sutton Town (Birmingham)
106	Chippenham Town	0–1	Westbury United
109	Chichester City	1–3	Winchester City
110	Holbeach United	0–2	Wisbech Town

=== 2nd replay ===
Tie	Home team	Score	Away team
14	Briggs Sports	1–0	Grays Athletic
79	Bedworth Town	3–1	Rugby Town

== 2nd qualifying round ==
=== Ties ===
Tie	Home team	Score	Away team
1	Alford United	0–3	Grantham
2	Andover	2–1	Winchester City
3	Ashton United	2–1	Leyland Motors
4	Banbury Spencer	3–1	Oxford City
5	Barry Town	5–2	Gloucester City
6	Beccles	2–2	Wymondham Town
7	Bedworth Town	1–1	Burton Albion
8	Bideford	4–1	St Blazey
9	Bognor Regis Town	2–2	Redhill
10	Boldon Colliery Welfare	1–2	Consett
11	Bridlington Central United	4–4	Whitby Town
12	Bury Town	2–3	Lowestoft Town
13	Cowes	2–3	Fareham Town
14	Dagenham	0–1	Briggs Sports
15	Denaby United	3–2	Stocksbridge Works
16	Dunstable Town	0–4	Bedford Town
17	Easington Colliery Welfare	4–2	Silksworth Colliery Welfare
18	Enfield	4–2	St Albans City
19	Epsom	3–2	Dorking
20	Eton Manor	3–3	Hitchin Town
21	Eynesbury Rovers	5–0	Bletchley & Wipac Sports
22	Fleetwood	0–0	Milnthorpe Corinthians
23	Frome Town	2–2	Westbury United
24	Goole Town	6–0	Harrogate Railway Athletic
25	Great Yarmouth Town	2–0	Gorleston
26	Gresley Rovers	0–1	Boots Athletic
27	Halesowen Town	3–0	Stourbridge
28	Hallam	0–2	Frickley Colliery
29	Heanor Town	1–2	Brush Sports
30	Hemel Hempstead	2–5	Finchley
31	Hyde United	1–3	Northwich Victoria
32	Ilkeston Town	3–1	South Normanton Miners Welfare
33	Kidderminster Harriers	2–0	Worcester City
34	King's Lynn	1–1	March Town United
35	Lancaster City	2–0	Penrith
36	Langold W M C	1–2	Bentley Colliery
37	Leyton	4–0	Clacton Town
38	Linby Colliery	3–3	Sutton Town
39	Llanelli	0–3	Lovells Athletic
40	Lockheed Leamington	3–4	Sutton Town (Birmingham)
41	Maidstone United	1–4	Margate
42	Murton Colliery Welfare	0–2	Ferryhill Athletic
43	New Brighton	4–2	Pwllheli & District
44	North Shields	3–1	Ashington
45	Ossett Town	3–2	Farsley Celtic
46	Penzance	4–3	Bodmin Town
47	Players Athletic	1–4	Whitwick Colliery
48	Poole Town	3–1	Bridport
49	Portland United	5–0	Ilminster Town
50	Ramsgate Athletic	1–1	Canterbury City
51	Rossendale United	2–1	Chorley
52	Runcorn	1–1	South Liverpool
53	Rushden Town	3–3	Rothwell Town
54	Salisbury	3–0	Bulford United
55	Shirebrook Miners Welfare	3–1	Ransome & Marles
56	Sittingbourne	0–0	Carshalton Athletic
57	Skegness Town	3–1	Brigg Town
58	Slough Town	3–3	Wycombe Wanderers
59	South Bank	0–1	Billingham Synthonia
60	South Shields	5–3	Cramlington Welfare
61	Southwick	1–2	Worthing
62	Spalding United	1–3	Corby Town
63	Street	3–6	Chippenham United
64	Sudbury Town	4–0	Stowmarket
65	Tow Law Town	1–4	West Auckland Town
66	Wealdstone	1–2	Southall
67	Weston Super Mare	5–1	Wells City
68	Willington	3–3	Shildon
69	Winsford United	5–1	Buxton
70	Wisbech Town	3–2	Ely City
71	Wolsingham Welfare	2–2	Durham City
72	Worksop Town	3–0	Beighton Miners Welfare

=== Replays ===
Tie	Home team	Score	Away team
6	Wymondham Town	1–2	Beccles
7	Burton Albion	3–2	Bedworth Town
9	Redhill	4–0	Bognor Regis Town
11	Whitby Town	0–1	Bridlington Central United
20	Hitchin Town	2–1	Eton Manor
22	Milnthorpe Corinthians	2–5	Fleetwood
23	Westbury United	1–2	Frome Town
35	March Town United	1–0	King's Lynn
38	Sutton Town	3–2	Linby Colliery
50	Canterbury City	2–5	Ramsgate Athletic
52	South Liverpool	1–3	Runcorn
53	Rothwell Town	3–2	Rushden Town
56	Carshalton Athletic	1–2	Sittingbourne
58	Wycombe Wanderers	1–0	Slough Town
68	Shildon	7–3	Willington
71	Durham City	2–0	Wolsingham Welfare

== 3rd qualifying round ==
=== Ties ===
Tie	Home team	Score	Away team
1	Ashton United	1–0	Rossendale United
2	Banbury Spencer	1–2	Wycombe Wanderers
3	Barry Town	1–3	Lovells Athletic
4	Beccles	1–4	Great Yarmouth Town
5	Bridlington Central United	1–0	Billingham Synthonia
6	Briggs Sports	1–2	Leyton
7	Brush Sports	1–0	Whitwick Colliery
8	Burton Albion	6–3	Sutton Town (Birmingham)
9	Chippenham United	3–2	Weston Super Mare
10	Consett	1–4	Easington Colliery Welfare
11	Corby Town	3–1	Rothwell Town
12	Durham City	0–0	Ferryhill Athletic
13	Epsom	1–3	Margate
14	Eynesbury Rovers	1–4	Bedford Town
15	Fareham Town	2–2	Andover
16	Fleetwood	1–1	Lancaster City
17	Frickley Colliery	3–5	Denaby United
18	Goole Town	2–1	Ossett Town
19	Grantham	3–3	Skegness Town
20	Hitchin Town	3–1	Enfield
21	Ilkeston Town	9–0	Boots Athletic
22	Kidderminster Harriers	0–0	Halesowen Town
23	Lowestoft Town	0–0	Sudbury Town
24	Northwich Victoria	2–2	Winsford United
25	Penzance	2–2	Bideford
26	Portland United	1–4	Poole Town
27	Runcorn	0–1	New Brighton
28	Salisbury	3–0	Frome Town
29	Sittingbourne	1–1	Ramsgate Athletic
30	South Shields	0–1	North Shields
31	Southall	3–0	Finchley
32	Sutton Town	4–1	Shirebrook Miners Welfare
33	West Auckland Town	1–1	Shildon
34	Wisbech Town	1–1	March Town United
35	Worksop Town	9–2	Bentley Colliery
36	Worthing	1–4	Redhill

=== Replays ===
Tie	Home team	Score	Away team
12	Ferryhill Athletic	0–2	Durham City
15	Andover	0–2	Fareham Town
16	Lancaster City	3–1	Fleetwood
19	Skegness Town	3–0	Grantham
22	Halesowen Town	1–0	Kidderminster Harriers
23	Sudbury Town	4–1	Lowestoft Town
24	Winsford United	1–2	Northwich Victoria
25	Bideford	2–0	Penzance
29	Ramsgate Athletic	3–2	Sittingbourne
33	Shildon	5–3	West Auckland Town
34	March Town United	3–0	Wisbech Town

== 4th qualifying round ==
The teams that given byes to this round are Crook Town, Walthamstow Avenue, Yeovil Town, Gainsborough Trinity, Weymouth, Rhyl, Hereford United, Wigan Athletic, Blyth Spartans, Peterborough United, Headington United, Hastings United, Guildford City, Spennymoor United, Horden Colliery Welfare, Nuneaton Borough, Selby Town, Newport I O W, Boston United, Scarborough, Netherfield, Dorchester Town and Hinckley Athletic.

=== Ties ===
Tie	Home team	Score	Away team
1	Ashton United	5–0	Wigan Athletic
2	Bedford Town	6–0	Walthamstow Avenue
3	Bideford	0–3	Yeovil Town
4	Blyth Spartans	2–4	Shildon
5	Brush Sports	0–2	Burton Albion
6	Chippenham United	2–6	Salisbury
7	Dorchester Town	3–0	Newport I O W
8	Durham City	5–2	Bridlington Central United
9	Guildford City	2–2	Ramsgate Athletic
10	Headington United	2–4	Margate
11	Hereford United	8–1	Nuneaton Borough
12	Hinckley Athletic	1–4	Halesowen Town
13	Horden Colliery Welfare	1–4	Easington Colliery Welfare
14	Ilkeston Town	1–3	Peterborough United
15	Leyton	3–1	Hitchin Town
16	Lovells Athletic	2–0	Merthyr Tydfil
17	March Town United	1–0	Great Yarmouth Town
18	Netherfield	2–0	Lancaster City
19	Northwich Victoria	3–1	Denaby United
20	Poole Town	2–3	Weymouth
21	Redhill	2–2	Hastings United
22	Rhyl	3–1	New Brighton
23	Scarborough	3–1	North Shields
24	Selby Town	2–4	Goole Town
25	Skegness Town	1–1	Gainsborough Trinity
26	Spennymoor United	2–2	Crook Town
27	Sudbury Town	4–4	Southall
28	Sutton Town	2–8	Boston United
29	Wycombe Wanderers	3–1	Fareham Town
30	Worksop Town	1–0	Corby Town

=== Replays ===
Tie	Home team	Score	Away team
9	Ramsgate Athletic	3–2	Guildford City
21	Hastings United	4–0	Redhill
25	Gainsborough Trinity	0–2	Skegness Town
26	Crook Town	5–0	Spennymoor United
27	Southall	2–2	Sudbury Town

=== 2nd replay ===
Tie	Home team	Score	Away team
27	Southall	7–2	Sudbury Town

== 1955–56 FA Cup ==
See 1955-56 FA Cup for details of the rounds from the first round proper onwards.
